= R. H. Bing =

American mathematician

- Born: October 20, 1914; Oakwood, Texas
- Died: April 28, 1986 (aged 71); Austin, Texas
- Education: Southwest Texas State Teachers College (BA); University of Texas at Austin (MEd, PhD)
- Known for: Bing–Borsuk conjecture Bing metrization theorem Bing's recognition theorem Bing shrinking Bing double
- Awards: Member of the National Academy of Sciences (1965); Lester R. Ford Award (1965)
- Scientific career
- Fields: Mathematics
- Workplaces: University of Wisconsin–Madison; University of Texas at Austin
- Thesis: Concerning Simple Plane Webs (1945)
- Doctoral advisor: Robert Lee Moore

R. H. Bing (October 20, 1914 – April 28, 1986) was an American mathematician who worked mainly in the areas of geometric topology and continuum theory. His work in studying the geometric topology of three-dimensional space was so fundamental and distinctive that the area is often referred to as "Bing-type topology".

== Early life and education ==
Bing was born on October 20, 1914, in Oakwood, Texas. His father, Rupert Henry Bing, was a teacher who became superintendent of the Oakwood School District, where he met Bing's mother, Lula May Thompson, a primary school teacher. After his parents married, his father left teaching to become a farmer and manager of several farms, but he died when Bing was five years old. His mother raised Bing and his younger sister in frugal circumstances and was a significant influence on his education, teaching him mental arithmetic and fostering his love of competition.

Bing graduated from Southwest Texas State Teachers College in 1935 after two and a half years of study. He then worked as a high-school teacher in Palestine, Texas, from 1935 to 1942, where his duties included coaching the football and track teams and teaching various subjects including mathematics and typing.

Studying at the University of Texas at Austin during the summers, Bing earned a Master of Education degree in 1938. During one of these summers he took a course under Robert Lee Moore and met Mary Blanche Hobbs in one of his classes. They married on August 26, 1938, and had four children: a son Robert Hobbs (1939) and three daughters Susan Elizabeth (1948), Virginia Gay (1949), and Mary Pat (1952).

In 1942, Moore arranged for Bing to receive a teaching position at the University of Texas, allowing him to continue graduate study toward a doctorate. Bing received his Ph.D. in 1945 with a dissertation on planar webs. Moore considered Bing to be among his most talented students, and later graduate students recalled that Moore judged them by comparison to Bing—generally not to their advantage.

=== Name ===
Bing's parents intended to name him after his father, which would have made him Rupert Henry Bing Jr., but his mother felt this was "too British for Texas" and compromised by abbreviating it to R. H. Consequently, R. H. does not stand for any first or middle name.

When Bing applied for a visa, he was told that initials would not be accepted. He explained that his name was "R-only H-only Bing", and received a visa made out to "Ronly Honly Bing".

== Mathematical contributions ==
Bing's mathematical research focused almost exclusively on 3-manifold theory and the geometric topology of $\mathbb R^3$. He was a powerful problem solver who laid the foundations for several areas of topology, and his papers have continued to serve as sources for major theoretical developments. One notable example was Michael Freedman's use of Bing's shrinking criterion to prove the four-dimensional Poincaré conjecture in 1982.

=== Early results ===
Bing established his reputation in June 1945, just one month after completing his dissertation, by solving the Kline sphere characterization problem. This famous, longstanding conjecture stated that a metric continuum in which every simple closed curve separates but for which no pair of points separates the space is homeomorphic to the 2-sphere. When word spread that an unknown young mathematician had settled this old conjecture, some were skeptical; when a famous professor wired Moore asking whether any first-class mathematician had checked the proof, Moore replied, "Yes, Bing had."

In 1948, Bing proved that the pseudo-arc is homogeneous, contradicting a published but erroneous "proof" to the contrary and contradicting most mathematicians' intuition about the pseudo-arc.

=== Metrization ===
Around 1950, one of the great unsolved problems in general topology was the problem of giving a topological characterization of the metrizability of topological spaces. In 1951, Bing gave such a characterization in his paper "Metrization of Topological Spaces". Jun-iti Nagata and Yuri Smirnov proved similar, independent results at about the same time, so the result is now known as the Bing–Nagata–Smirnov metrization theorem. This paper has probably been cited more than any other of Bing's works, even though he later became more closely identified with geometric topology.

In this paper, Bing also introduced the important concept of collectionwise normality and proved that a Moore space is metrizable if and only if it is collectionwise normal. He constructed an example of a normal space that is not collectionwise normal, known as "Example G", which became influential in point-set topology.

=== Geometric topology ===
Bing's first major paper in geometric topology appeared in 1952 in the Annals of Mathematics. He showed that the double of a solid Alexander horned sphere was the 3-sphere, demonstrating the existence of wild involutions on the 3-sphere with fixed point set equal to a wildly embedded 2-sphere. This meant that the original Smith conjecture needed to be rephrased in a suitable category, and the result jump-started research into crumpled cubes. The proof involved a shrinking method later developed by Bing and others into a powerful set of techniques called Bing shrinking. Proofs of the generalized Schoenflies conjecture and the double suspension theorem relied on Bing-type shrinking.

In 1957 alone, three of Bing's papers appeared in the Annals of Mathematics, concerning decompositions of Euclidean 3-space and the approximation of surfaces by polyhedral surfaces. He later proved that polyhedral approximations can be constructed to lie "mostly" on one side of the surface being approximated.

=== Poincaré conjecture ===
Bing was fascinated by the Poincaré conjecture and made several major attempts to prove it, contributing to its reputation as an extremely difficult problem. In 1958, he proved a partial result: a simply connected, closed 3-manifold in which every loop is contained in a 3-ball is homeomorphic to the 3-sphere.

Bing initiated research into what became known as the Property P conjecture, including giving it its name, as a potentially more tractable approach to the Poincaré conjecture. Property P was proven in 2004 as a culmination of work from several areas of mathematics, with some irony, this proof was announced shortly after Grigori Perelman announced his proof of the Poincaré conjecture itself.

=== Side-approximation theorem ===
The side-approximation theorem was considered by Bing to be one of his key discoveries. It has many applications, including a simplified proof of Moise's theorem, which states that every 3-manifold can be triangulated in an essentially unique way. In 1959, Bing published an independent proof of the triangulation theorem, which had recently been proved by Edwin E. Moise using more complicated methods.

=== Notable examples ===
Along the way, Bing produced many counterexamples with nicknames: "The Bing Sling"—a simple closed curve that pierces no disk (1956); "Bing's Sticky Foot Topology"—a connected countable Hausdorff space (1953); and "Bing's Hooked Rug"—a wild 2-sphere in 3-space that contains no wild arc (1961).

==== The house with two rooms ====
The house with two rooms is a contractible 2-complex that is not collapsible. Another such example, popularized by E. C. Zeeman, is the dunce hat. The house with two rooms can be thickened and triangulated to be unshellable, despite topologically being a 3-ball. It appears in various contexts in topology, including the proof that every compact 3-manifold has a standard spine.

==== Dogbone space ====
The dogbone space is the quotient space obtained from a cellular decomposition of $\mathbb R^3$ into points and polygonal arcs. The quotient space $B$ is not a manifold, but $B \times \mathbb R$ is homeomorphic to $\mathbb R^4$.

== Career ==
Bing's solution of the Kline sphere characterization problem brought him offers from Princeton University and the University of Wisconsin–Madison. He chose Wisconsin in 1947, preferring not to work in the shadow of established topologists at Princeton. He remained at Wisconsin for 26 years, except for leaves at the University of Virginia (1949–50), the Institute for Advanced Study (1957–58, 1962–63, 1967), and the University of Texas (1971–72). At Wisconsin he was appointed Rudolph E. Langer Research Professor in 1968 and served as department chairman from 1958 to 1960.

Bing returned permanently to the University of Texas at Austin in 1973 with the goal of building the mathematics department into a top-ten state university program. He was chairman of the department from 1975 to 1977 and retired in 1985 as the Mildred Caldwell and Blaine Perkins Kerr Centennial Professor in Mathematics.

During his years at Wisconsin, Bing directed an effective training program for future topologists; his first-year graduate topology classes sometimes numbered more than 40 students. He directed the Ph.D. dissertations of 35 students.

== Awards and honors ==
- Member of the National Academy of Sciences (1965)
- Lester R. Ford Award from the Mathematical Association of America (1965)
- Chairman of Division of Mathematics of the National Research Council (1967–1969)
- United States delegate to the International Mathematical Union (1966, 1978)
- Colloquium Lecturer of the American Mathematical Society (1970)
- Award for Distinguished Service to Mathematics from the Mathematical Association of America (1974)
- President of the Mathematical Association of America (1963–1964)
- President of the American Mathematical Society (1977–1978)
- Fellow of the American Academy of Arts and Sciences (1980)

== Published works ==
- Bing, R. H. (1983), The geometric topology of 3-manifolds, American Mathematical Society Colloquium Publications, vol. 40, Providence, R.I.: American Mathematical Society, ISBN 978-0-8218-1040-8, MR 0728227
- Bing, R. H. (1988), Collected papers. Vol. 1, 2, Providence, R.I.: American Mathematical Society, ISBN 978-0-8218-0117-8, MR 0950859

== Sources ==
- Singh, S. (1986), "R. H. Bing (1914–1986): a tribute", Topology and Its Applications, 24 (1–3): 5–8, doi:10.1016/0166-8641(86)90045-3, ISSN 0166-8641, MR 0872474
- Brown, M. (1987), "The mathematical work of R H Bing" (PDF), Topology Proceedings, 12 (1): 1–25
