= Alexander horned sphere =

Pathological embedding of the sphere in 3D space

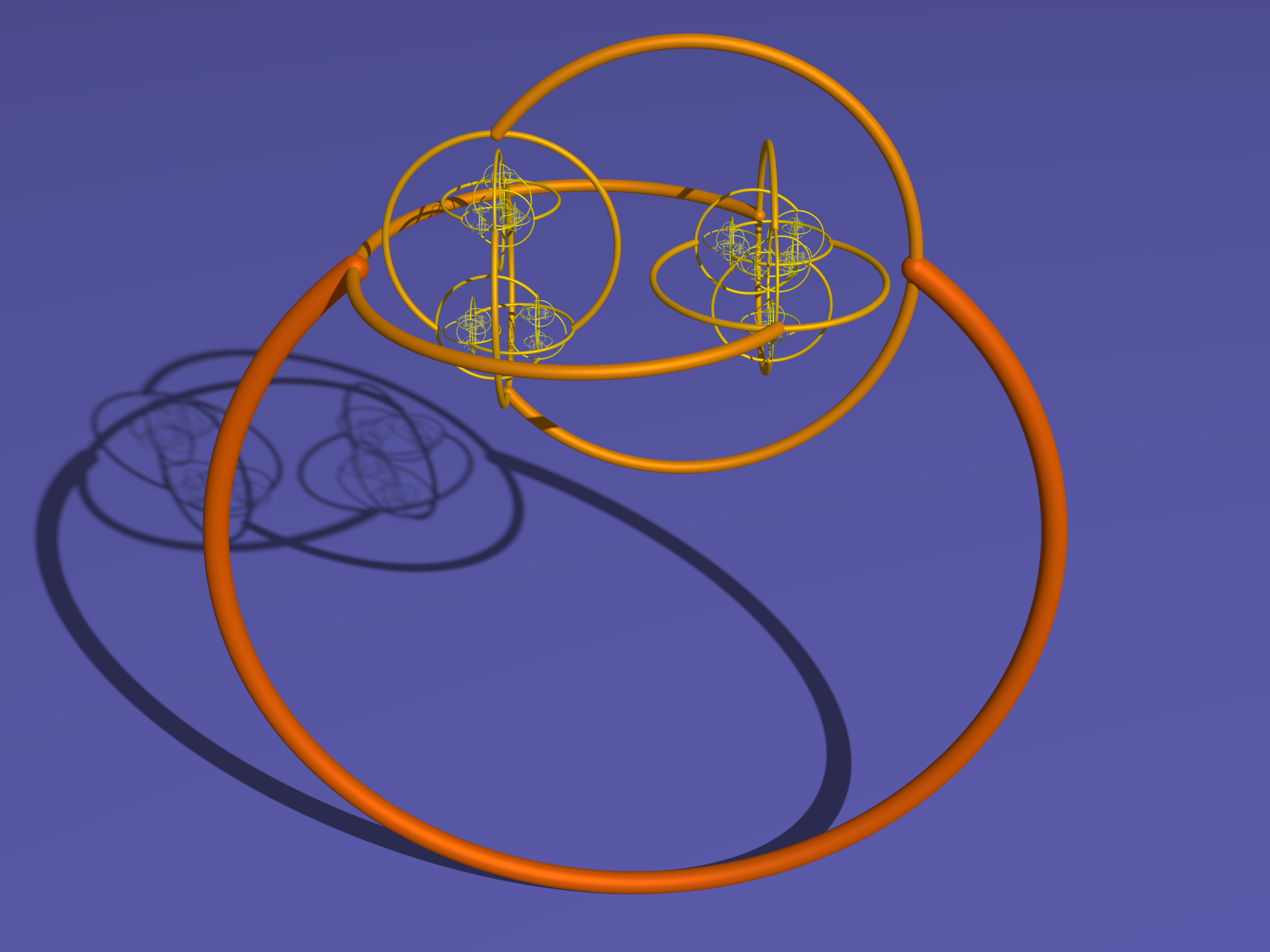
Alexander horned sphere

The Alexander horned sphere is a pathological embedding of the 2-sphere into 3-dimensional Euclidean space. The topological object was discovered by J. W. Alexander (1924).

It is a particular topological embedding of a two-dimensional sphere in three-dimensional space. Together with its inside, it is a topological 3-ball, the Alexander horned ball, and so is simply connected; i.e., every loop can be shrunk to a point while staying inside. However, the exterior is not simply connected, unlike the exterior of the usual round sphere.

The Schoenflies theorem in 2D states that any simple closed curve in the plane can be extended to a homeomorphism of the entire plane. If this held in 3D, the exterior of any embedded sphere would have to be homeomorphic to the exterior of a standard sphere. The Alexander horned sphere proves this is false because the exterior of a standard sphere is simply connected, while $D_{ext}$ is not. Therefore, there is no homeomorphism of $\mathbb{R}^3$ that can "straighten" the horned sphere into a standard sphere.

== History ==
In the late 19th century, the Jordan curve theorem established that every simple closed curve in the plane divides it into two regions. Mathematicians of the era, including Camille Jordan and Arthur Moritz Schoenflies, sought to generalize this to higher dimensions. The Schoenflies theorem successfully proved that in two dimensions, any such curve is "well-behaved"—meaning the regions it bounds are always homeomorphic to standard disks. It was widely conjectured that a similar principle would apply to a 2-sphere embedded in 3-dimensional space.

=== Antoine's necklace ===
The conceptual groundwork for structures was laid by the French mathematician Louis Antoine. In 1921, Antoine constructed a remarkable topological object known as Antoine's necklace, a Cantor set in $\mathbb{R}^3$ whose complement is not simply connected.

Antoine's construction used a sequence of interlocking solid tori. This proved that a "zero-dimensional" object (a Cantor set) could be embedded in 3D space in a way that "snags" loops, a phenomenon impossible in 2D.

=== Alexander's counterexample ===
In 1924, James Waddell Alexander II published his findings in the Proceedings of the National Academy of Sciences. Prior to this, Alexander had actually published a "proof" that the Schoenflies theorem did hold in 3D. Upon realizing his error, he constructed the horned sphere as a definitive counterexample.

Alexander's genius was in realizing that the "wildness" Antoine had found in a Cantor set could be incorporated into the surface of a 2-sphere. By replacing the simple links of Antoine's necklace with "horns" that grow from a sphere, Alexander showed that:

1. A sphere can be topologically "simple" (homeomorphic to $S^2$).
2. Yet, it can be "wildly" embedded such that the exterior space is knotted infinitely many times.

Alexander's discovery forced topologists to distinguish between tame embeddings and wild embeddings.

This distinction led to the development of PL topology (Piecewise Linear) and eventually helped frame the Generalized Poincaré conjecture.

== Construction ==
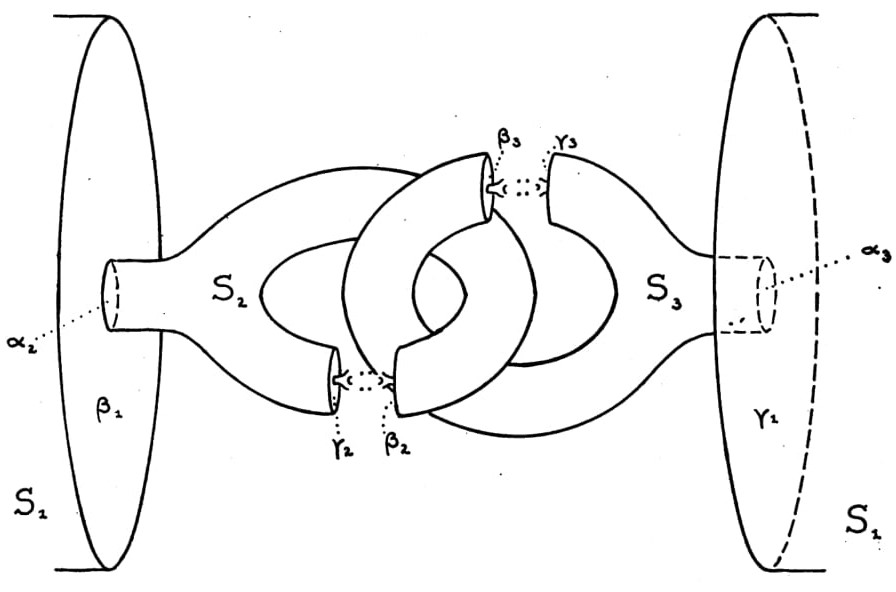
Diagram of the first few iterative steps in the construction of Alexander's horned sphere, from Alexander's original 1924 paper

The construction of the Alexander horned sphere is an iterative process.

The Alexander horned sphere is the particular (topological) embedding of a sphere in 3-dimensional Euclidean space obtained by the following construction, starting with a standard torus:

1. Remove a radial slice of the torus.
2. Connect a standard punctured torus to each side of the cut, interlinked with the torus on the other side.
3. Repeat steps 1–2 on the two tori just added ad infinitum.

Animated construction of Alexander's sphere.

The Alexander horned sphere is the limit of this process as the number of iterations $n$ approaches infinity ($n \to \infty$).

By considering only the points of the tori that are not removed at some stage, the result is an embedding of the sphere with a Cantor set removed.

This embedding extends to a continuous map from the whole sphere, which is injective (hence a topological embedding since the sphere is compact) since points in the sphere approaching two different points of the Cantor set will end up in different 'horns' at some stage and therefore have different images.

The resulting boundary is a continuous surface. Because the horns become infinitely thin, the "ends" of the horns do not form holes but rather a Cantor set of points on the surface. It can be proven that the resulting object is still homeomorphic to a standard 2-sphere. Intuitively, one can imagine "undoing" the horns one by one; however, because there are infinitely many interlocked levels, this cannot be done via a homeomorphism of the surrounding 3D space.

== Definition ==
Formally, let $S^2$ be the standard 2-sphere. An embedding $f: S^2 \hookrightarrow \mathbb{R}^3$ is called the Alexander horned sphere if its image is the limit of a specific recursive construction involving interlocking "horns".

Unlike the standard sphere, the complement of the Alexander horned sphere in $\mathbb{R}^3$ is not simply connected. Specifically, the fundamental group of the unbounded component of $\mathbb{R}^3 \setminus f(S^2)$ is non-trivial, meaning there exist loops in the exterior that cannot be continuously shrunk to a point without passing through the surface.

== Topological distinction of components ==
According to the Jordan-Brouwer separation theorem, any embedding of a 2-sphere into $\mathbb{R}^3$ divides the space into exactly two connected components: a bounded "interior" and an unbounded "exterior". In the case of the Alexander horned sphere, these two components exhibit radically different topological properties.

=== The interior component (the bounded region) ===
The interior of the Alexander horned sphere, denoted here as $D_{int}$, is relatively well-behaved.

Despite the fractal-like complexity of the boundary, the interior region is homeomorphic to the open unit 3-ball $B^3$. Any loop drawn entirely within the interior can be continuously contracted to a point without leaving the interior. The closure of the interior, $\overline{D_{int}}$, is a topological 3-cell.

=== The exterior component (the unbounded region) ===
The exterior region, $D_{ext} = \mathbb{R}^3 \setminus \overline{D_{int}}$, is where the "pathology" of the Alexander horned sphere resides. It serves as a counterexample to the intuition that the space outside a sphere should behave like the space outside a standard ball.

The fundamental group of the exterior, $\pi_1(D_{ext})$, is non-trivial. There exist closed loops in the exterior that are "hooked" through the infinitely many branches of the horns. The "tips" of the horns form a Cantor set in $\mathbb{R}^3$. Because the horns interlock in a limit-process, a loop encircling one of the starting "rungs" cannot be pulled through the increasingly fine structure of the interlocking grips.

Property comparison
Property	Interior Component	Exterior component
Homeomorphic to standard ball/space?	Yes ($B^3$)	No
Simply connected?	Yes	No
Fundamental group $\pi_1$	Trivial ($0$)	Non-trivial
Locally flat boundary?	Yes	No (Wild at the Cantor set)

== Properties ==
=== Homeomorphism to sphere ===
Despite its appearance, the Alexander horned sphere is homeomorphic to the standard unit sphere.

There exists a continuous, bijective map $h: S^2 \to S$ with a continuous inverse.

From an intrinsic point of view (that of a 2D creature living on the surface), the horned sphere has no holes, no edges, and is perfectly "normal."

Alexander horned sphere vs sphere
Property	Alexander horned sphere	Standard 2-sphere
Intrinsic topology	Homeomorphic to $S^2$	Homeomorphic to $S^2$
Exterior component	Not simply connected	Simply connected
Fundamental group of the exterior component	Infinitely generated	Trivial (0)
Local flatness	Fails at a Cantor set	Holds everywhere
Embedding type	Wild	Tame

=== Fundamental group ===
The most famous property of the Alexander horned sphere is that its exterior, $D_{ext} = \mathbb{R}^3 \setminus \overline{D_{int}}$, is not simply connected.

In a standard sphere embedding, the fundamental group of the exterior is:
$$\pi_1(\mathbb{R}^3 \setminus S^2_{standard}) = 0$$

However, for the Alexander horned sphere, it is:
$$\pi_1(\mathbb{R}^3 \setminus S) \neq 0$$

If one places a loop around the first "bridge" or "rung" of the construction (where the first two horns nearly meet), this loop cannot be shrunk to a point. Any attempt to pull the loop "off" the horns causes it to get snagged by the next, smaller generation of interlocking horns. Because this process continues to infinity, the snag can never be cleared.

=== Local flatness ===
A surface in 3D is "locally flat" at a point if, near that point, the embedding looks like a standard flat plane dividing space. The Alexander horned sphere is locally flat everywhere except at the points of its limit set (the Cantor set where the horn tips meet).

At these Cantor points, the sphere is "wild". This set of wild points is the reason the Schoenflies theorem fails in three dimensions.

== Schoenflies theorem counterexample ==
In topology, the Schoenflies theorem provides a fundamental result regarding how spheres can be embedded into Euclidean space. While the theorem holds perfectly in two dimensions, the Alexander horned sphere serves as the primary counterexample proving its failure in three dimensions.

The theorem, named after Arthur Moritz Schoenflies, states that for any simple closed curve (a Jordan curve) $C$ in the plane $\mathbb{R}^2$, there exists a homeomorphism $f: \mathbb{R}^2 \to \mathbb{R}^2$ such that $f(C)$ is the standard unit circle.

Essentially, this means:

1. Any closed loop in 2D space is "tame".
2. The "inside" is always a disk.
3. The "outside" is always homeomorphic to the exterior of a standard circle.
4. You can always "straighten out" or "un-knot" any 2D loop into a perfect circle via a global deformation of the plane.

It was initially conjectured that this would generalize to 3D: that any embedded 2-sphere in $\mathbb{R}^3$ could be straightened into a standard round sphere. The Alexander horned sphere proves this is impossible.

Because the fundamental group of the exterior of the Alexander horned sphere is non-trivial ($\pi_1(D_{ext}) \neq 0$), while the fundamental group of the exterior of a standard sphere is trivial ($\pi_1 = 0$), there can be no homeomorphism of the ambient space $\mathbb{R}^3$ that maps one to the other.

A homeomorphism of the entire space would have to preserve the fundamental group of the complement. Since the groups are different, the embeddings are fundamentally different.

The Alexander horned sphere is topologically a sphere, but it is not ambiently homeomorphic to the standard sphere.

=== The Mazur–Brown theorem ===
Despite the failure of the original Schoenflies theorem in 3D, a version of it was salvaged in 1960 by Morton Brown and Barry Mazur. Known as the generalized Schoenflies theorem, it states that the theorem does hold for all dimensions $n$ if the embedding of the sphere is "locally flat" everywhere. The Alexander horned sphere avoids this because it is not locally flat at the points of its Cantor set.

== Impact on theory ==
The horned sphere, together with its inside, is a topological 3-ball, the Alexander horned ball, and so is simply connected; i.e., every loop can be shrunk to a point while staying inside. The exterior is not simply connected, unlike the exterior of the usual round sphere; a loop linking a torus in the above construction cannot be shrunk to a point without touching the horned sphere. This shows that the Jordan–Schönflies theorem does not hold in three dimensions, as Alexander had originally thought. Alexander also proved that the theorem does hold in three dimensions for piecewise linear/smooth embeddings. This is one of the earliest examples where the need for distinction between the categories of topological manifolds, differentiable manifolds, and piecewise linear manifolds became apparent.

Now consider Alexander's horned sphere as an embedding into the 3-sphere, considered as the one-point compactification of the 3-dimensional Euclidean space R^{3}. The closure of the non-simply connected domain is called the solid Alexander horned sphere. Although the solid horned sphere is not a manifold, R. H. Bing showed that its double (which is the 3-manifold obtained by gluing two copies of the horned sphere together along the corresponding points of their boundaries) is in fact the 3-sphere. One can consider other gluings of the solid horned sphere to a copy of itself, arising from different homeomorphisms of the boundary sphere to itself. This has also been shown to be the 3-sphere. The solid Alexander horned sphere is an example of a crumpled cube; i.e., a closed complementary domain of the embedding of a 2-sphere into the 3-sphere.

== Generalizations and related concepts ==
One can generalize Alexander's construction to generate other horned spheres by increasing the number of horns at each stage of Alexander's construction or considering the analogous construction in higher dimensions.

Other substantially different constructions exist for constructing such "wild" spheres. Another example, also found by Alexander, is Antoine's horned sphere, which is based on Antoine's necklace, a pathological embedding of the Cantor set into the 3-sphere.

=== Higher dimensional horned spheres ===
The construction can be generalized to any dimension $n > 3$. For any $n \geq 3$, there exists an embedding of the $(n-1)$-sphere $S^{n-1}$ into $\mathbb{R}^n$ such that the unbounded component of its complement is not simply connected. These are often referred to as higher-dimensional Alexander spheres.

=== The lakes of Wada ===
Animation of digging lakes up to day 5

While the horned sphere deals with the complexity of a boundary, the lakes of Wada are three disjoint open sets in the plane or space that all share the exact same boundary. It is often cited alongside the Alexander horned sphere as a classic example of how human intuition fails to grasp the limit-properties of infinite recursive boundaries.

=== The Bing sphere ===
Named after R. H. Bing, the Bing sphere (or Bing's "hooked" sphere) is another wild embedding.

- While Alexander's construction uses interlocking horns that never touch, Bing's construction is even more counter-intuitive.
- Bing proved that one can glue two solid Alexander horned spheres together along their boundaries to produce a 3-sphere $S^3$. This was a monumental result in showing that "wild" pieces can assemble into a "tame" whole.

=== Antoine's necklace ===
As the spiritual predecessor to the horned sphere, Antoine's necklace is a Cantor set in $\mathbb{R}^3$ with a non-simply connected complement. The Alexander horned sphere can be viewed as an attempt to "skin" Antoine's necklace with a continuous surface. The "wild points" of the horned sphere (the tips of the horns) are exactly a Cantor set of the Antoine type.

=== Summary ===
Summary
Object	Dimension	Key pathology
Antoine's necklace	0 (Cantor Set)	First object to show a non-simply connected complement in $\mathbb{R}^3$.
Alexander horned sphere	2 (Surface)	Counterexample to the 3D Schoenflies conjecture.
Bing sphere	2 (Surface)	A sphere that cannot be sliced into two disks by any plane.
Fox–Artin wild arc	1 (Line segment)	An arc (simple path) in $\mathbb{R}^3$ whose complement is not simply connected.

== See also ==
=== Topological Structures ===
- Antoine's necklace – The first "wild" Cantor set in 3D space, which served as the inspiration for the horned sphere.
- Lakes of Wada – Three connected open sets in the plane that share the same boundary.
- Warsaw circle – A compact subset of the plane which is not locally connected, serving as a counterexample in shape theory.
- Sierpiński carpet and Menger sponge – Fractal structures that explore the boundaries of dimension and measure.
- Wild arc, specifically the Fox–Artin arc – An embedding of an interval into 3D space that is "knotted" at every point.
- Cantor tree surface
- Wild knot

=== Mathematical concepts ===
- Jordan curve theorem – The foundational theorem that the horned sphere generalizes (and challenges) in higher dimensions.
- Schoenflies theorem – The specific theorem, for the three-dimensional version of which the horned sphere is a counterexample.
- Fundamental group – The algebraic tool used to prove the exterior of the horned sphere is not simply connected.

=== Notable topologists ===
- James Waddell Alexander II – Discoverer of the horned sphere and a founder of algebraic topology.
- R. H. Bing – Known for his work on wild spheres and the house with two rooms.
- Morton Brown and Barry Mazur – Provers of the generalized Schoenflies theorem.
- Louis Antoine – The first to demonstrate that the complement of a Cantor set could be non-simply connected.

=== Further topology topics ===
- Algebraic topology
- Geometric topology
- List of topology topics
