= Jordan curve theorem =

Theorem in topology

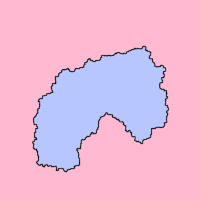
Illustration of the Jordan curve theorem. The Jordan curve (drawn in black) divides the plane into an "interior" region (light blue) and an "exterior" region (pink).

In topology, a discipline within mathematics, the Jordan curve theorem (JCT), formulated by Camille Jordan in 1887, asserts that every simple closed curve in the plane (known as a Jordan curve) divides the plane into two regions: the interior, bounded by the curve, (Note: Not to be confused with the interior of a set.) and an unbounded exterior, containing all of the nearby and faraway exterior points. Every continuous path connecting a point of one region to a point of the other must intersect the curve somewhere.

While the theorem seems intuitively obvious, it takes some ingenuity to prove it by elementary means. "Although the JCT is one of the best known topological theorems, there are many, even among professional mathematicians, who have never read a proof of it." (Tverberg (1980, Introduction)). More transparent proofs rely on the mathematical machinery of algebraic topology, and these lead to generalizations to higher-dimensional spaces.

The Jordan curve theorem is named after the Camille Jordan, who published its first claimed proof in 1887. For decades, mathematicians generally thought that this proof was flawed and that the first rigorous proof was carried out by Oswald Veblen; however, this notion has been overturned by Thomas C. Hales and others.

== Definitions and the statement of the Jordan theorem ==
A Jordan curve or a simple closed curve in the plane $\mathbb{R}^2$ is the image $C$ of an injective continuous map of a circle into the plane, $\varphi: S^1 \to \mathbb{R}^2$. A Jordan arc in the plane is the image of an injective continuous map of a closed and bounded interval $[a, b]$ into the plane. It is a plane curve that is not necessarily smooth or algebraic.

Alternatively, a Jordan curve is the image of a continuous map $\varphi: [0,1] \to \mathbb{R}^2$ such that $\varphi(0) = \varphi(1)$ and the restriction of $\varphi$ to $[0,1)$ is injective. The first two conditions say that $C$ is a continuous loop, whereas the last condition stipulates that $C$ has no self-intersection points.

With these definitions, the Jordan curve theorem can be stated as follows:

Theorem—Let $C$ be a Jordan curve in the plane $\mathbb{R}^2$. Then its complement, $\mathbb{R}^2 \setminus C$, consists of exactly two connected components. One of these components is bounded (the interior) and the other is unbounded (the exterior), and the curve $C$ is the boundary of each component.

In contrast, the complement of a Jordan arc in the plane is connected.

== Proof and generalizations ==
The Jordan curve theorem was independently generalized to higher dimensions by H. Lebesgue and L. E. J. Brouwer in 1911, resulting in the Jordan–Brouwer separation theorem.

Theorem—Let X be an n-dimensional topological sphere in the (n+1)-dimensional Euclidean space R^{n+1} (n > 0), i.e. the image of an injective continuous mapping of the n-sphere S^{n} into R^{n+1}. Then the complement Y of X in R^{n+1} consists of exactly two connected components. One of these components is bounded (the interior) and the other is unbounded (the exterior). The set X is their common boundary.

The proof uses homology theory. It is first established that, more generally, if X is homeomorphic to the k-sphere, then the reduced integral homology groups of Y = R^{n+1} \ X are as follows:

$$\tilde{H}_{q}(Y)= \begin{cases}\mathbb{Z}, & q=n-k\text{ or }q=n, \\ \{0\}, & \text{otherwise}.\end{cases}$$

This is proved by induction in k using the Mayer–Vietoris sequence. When n = k, the zeroth reduced homology of Y has rank 1, which means that Y has 2 connected components (which are, moreover, path connected), and with a bit of extra work, one shows that their common boundary is X. A further generalization was found by J. W. Alexander, who established the Alexander duality between the reduced homology of a compact subset X of R^{n+1} and the reduced cohomology of its complement. If X is an n-dimensional compact connected submanifold of R^{n+1} (or S^{n+1}) without boundary, its complement has 2 connected components.

There is a strengthening of the Jordan curve theorem, called the Jordan–Schönflies theorem, which states that the interior and the exterior planar regions determined by a Jordan curve in R^{2} are homeomorphic to the interior and exterior of the unit disk. In particular, for any point P in the interior region and a point A on the Jordan curve, there exists a Jordan arc connecting P with A and, with the exception of the endpoint A, completely lying in the interior region. An alternative and equivalent formulation of the Jordan–Schönflies theorem asserts that any Jordan curve φ: S^{1} → R^{2}, where S^{1} is viewed as the unit circle in the plane, can be extended to a homeomorphism ψ: R^{2} → R^{2} of the plane. Unlike Lebesgue's and Brouwer's generalization of the Jordan curve theorem, this statement becomes false in higher dimensions: while the exterior of the unit ball in R^{3} is simply connected, because it retracts onto the unit sphere, the Alexander horned sphere is a subset of R^{3} homeomorphic to a sphere, but so twisted in space that the unbounded component of its complement in R^{3} is not simply connected, and hence not homeomorphic to the exterior of the unit ball.

=== Arbitrary number of connected components ===
Let $K_0$ and $K_1$ be homotopy-equivalent compacts in $\mathbb{R}^n$. Then if $\mathbb{R}^n\setminus K_i$ has a finite number of connected components for $i=0,1$, then so does $\mathbb{R}^n\setminus K_{1-i}$, and the two numbers coincide. If $\mathbb{R}^n\setminus K_i$ has infinite number of connected components, so does $\mathbb{R}^n\setminus K_{1-i}$.

=== Discrete version ===
The Jordan curve theorem can be proved from the Brouwer fixed-point theorem (in two dimensions), and the Brouwer fixed-point theorem can be proved from the Hex theorem: "every game of Hex has at least one winner", from which we obtain a logical implication: Hex theorem implies Brouwer fixed-point theorem, which implies Jordan curve theorem.

It is clear that Jordan curve theorem implies the "strong Hex theorem": "every game of Hex ends with exactly one winner, with no possibility of both sides losing or both sides winning"; thus, the Jordan curve theorem is equivalent to the strong Hex theorem, which is a purely discrete theorem.

The Brouwer fixed-point theorem, by being sandwiched between the two equivalent theorems, is also equivalent to both.

In reverse mathematics, and computer-formalized mathematics, the Jordan curve theorem is commonly proved by first converting it to an equivalent discrete version similar to the strong Hex theorem, then proving the discrete version.

==== Application to image processing ====
In image processing, a binary picture is a discrete square grid of 0 and 1, or equivalently, a compact subset of $\Z^2$. Topological invariants on $\R^2$, such as number of components, might fail to be well-defined for $\Z^2$ if $\Z^2$ does not have an appropriately defined graph structure.

There are two obvious graph structures on $\Z^2$:

8-neighbor and 4-neighbor square grids.

- the "4-neighbor square grid", where each vertex $(x, y)$ is connected with $(x+1, y), (x-1, y), (x, y+1), (x, y-1)$.
- the "8-neighbor square grid", where each vertex $(x, y)$ is connected with $(x', y')$ iff $|x-x'| \leq 1, |y-y'| \leq 1$, and $(x, y) \neq (x', y')$.

Both graph structures fail to satisfy the strong Hex theorem. The 4-neighbor square grid allows a no-winner situation, and the 8-neighbor square grid allows a two-winner situation. Consequently, connectedness properties in $\R^2$, such as the Jordan curve theorem, do not generalize to $\Z^2$ under either graph structure.

If the "6-neighbor square grid" structure is imposed on $\Z^2$, then it is the hexagonal grid, and thus satisfies the strong Hex theorem, allowing the Jordan curve theorem to generalize. For this reason, when computing connected components in a binary image, the 6-neighbor square grid is generally used.

==== Steinhaus chessboard theorem ====
The Steinhaus chessboard theorem in some sense shows that the 4-neighbor grid and the 8-neighbor grid "together" implies the Jordan curve theorem, and the 6-neighbor grid is a precise interpolation between them.

The theorem states the following: suppose you put bombs on some squares on a $n\times n$ chessboard, so that a king cannot move from the bottom side to the top side without stepping on a bomb, then a rook can move from the left side to the right side stepping only on bombs.

== History and further proofs ==
The statement of the Jordan curve theorem may seem obvious at first, but it is a rather difficult theorem to prove. Bernard Bolzano was the first to formulate a precise conjecture, observing that it was not a self-evident statement, but that it required a proof. It is easy to establish this result for polygons, but the problem came in generalizing it to all kinds of badly behaved curves, which include nowhere-differentiable curves, such as the Koch snowflake and other fractal curves, or even a Jordan curve of positive area constructed by Osgood (1903).

The first proof of this theorem was given by Camille Jordan in his lectures on real analysis, and was published in his book Cours d'analyse de l'École Polytechnique. There is some controversy about whether Jordan's proof was complete: the majority of commenters on it have claimed that the first complete proof was given later by Oswald Veblen, who said the following about Jordan's proof:

His proof, however, is unsatisfactory to many mathematicians. It assumes the theorem without proof in the important special case of a simple polygon, and of the argument from that point on, one must admit at least that all details are not given.

However, Thomas C. Hales wrote:

Nearly every modern citation that I have found agrees that the first correct proof is due to Veblen... In view of the heavy criticism of Jordan’s proof, I was surprised when I sat down to read his proof to find nothing objectionable about it. Since then, I have contacted a number of the authors who have criticized Jordan, and each case the author has admitted to having no direct knowledge of an error in Jordan’s proof.

Hales also pointed out that the special case of simple polygons is not only an easy exercise but was not really used by Jordan anyway, and quoted Michael Reeken as saying:

Jordan’s proof is essentially correct... Jordan’s proof does not present the details in a satisfactory way. But the idea is right, and with some polishing the proof would be impeccable.

Earlier, Jordan's proof and another early proof by Charles Jean de la Vallée Poussin had already been critically analyzed and completed by Schoenflies (1924).

Due to the importance of the Jordan curve theorem in low-dimensional topology and complex analysis, it received much attention from prominent mathematicians of the first half of the 20th century. Various proofs of the theorem and its generalizations were constructed by J. W. Alexander, Louis Antoine, Ludwig Bieberbach, Luitzen Brouwer, Arnaud Denjoy, Friedrich Hartogs, Béla Kerékjártó, Alfred Pringsheim, and Arthur Moritz Schoenflies.

New elementary proofs of the Jordan curve theorem, as well as simplifications of the earlier proofs, continue to be carried out.

- Elementary proofs were presented by Filippov (1950) and Tverberg (1980).
- A proof in non-standard analysis by Narens (1971).
- A proof in constructive mathematics by Gordon O. Berg, W. Julian, and R. Mines et al. (1975).
- A proof using the Brouwer fixed-point theorem by Maehara (1984).
- A proof using non-planarity of the complete bipartite graph K_{3,3} was given by Thomassen (1992).

The root of the difficulty is explained in Tverberg (1980) as follows. It is relatively simple to prove that the Jordan curve theorem holds for every Jordan polygon (Lemma 1), and every Jordan curve can be approximated arbitrarily well by a Jordan polygon (Lemma 2). A Jordan polygon is a polygonal chain, the boundary of a bounded connected open set, call it the open polygon, and its closure, the closed polygon. Consider the diameter $\delta$ of the largest disk contained in the closed polygon. Evidently, $\delta$ is positive. Using a sequence of Jordan polygons (that converge to the given Jordan curve) we have a sequence $\delta_1, \delta_2, \dots$ presumably converging to a positive number, the diameter $\delta$ of the largest disk contained in the closed region bounded by the Jordan curve. However, we have to prove that the sequence $\delta_1, \delta_2, \dots$ does not converge to zero, using only the given Jordan curve, not the region presumably bounded by the curve. This is the point of Tverberg's Lemma 3. Roughly, the closed polygons should not thin to zero everywhere. Moreover, they should not thin to zero somewhere, which is the point of Tverberg's Lemma 4.

The first formal proof of the Jordan curve theorem was created by Hales (2007a) in the HOL Light system, in January 2005, and contained about 60,000 lines. Another rigorous 6,500-line formal proof was produced in 2005 by an international team of mathematicians using the Mizar system. Both the Mizar and the HOL Light proof rely on libraries of previously proved theorems, so these two sizes are not comparable. Nobuyuki Sakamoto and Keita Yokoyama (2007) showed that in reverse mathematics the Jordan curve theorem is equivalent to weak Kőnig's lemma over the system $\mathsf{RCA}_0$.

== Application ==
If the initial point (p_{a}) of a ray (in red) lies outside a simple polygon (region A), the number of intersections of the ray and the polygon is even. If the initial point (p_{b}) of a ray lies inside the polygon (region B), the number of intersections is odd.

In computational geometry, the Jordan curve theorem can be used for testing whether a point lies inside or outside a simple polygon.

From a given point, trace a ray that does not pass through any vertex of the polygon (all rays but a finite number are convenient). Then, compute the number n of intersections of the ray with an edge of the polygon. Jordan curve theorem proof implies that the point is inside the polygon if and only if n is odd.

== Computational aspects ==
Adler, Daskalakis and Demaine prove that a computational version of Jordan's theorem is PPAD-complete. As a corollary, they show that Jordan's theorem implies the Brouwer fixed-point theorem. This complements the earlier result by Maehara, that Brouwer's fixed point theorem implies Jordan's theorem.

== See also ==
- Curve orientation
- Denjoy–Riesz theorem, a description of certain sets of points in the plane that can be subsets of Jordan curves
- Lakes of Wada
- Quasi-Fuchsian group, a mathematical group that preserves a Jordan curve
- Slitherlink, a logic puzzle where the answer is a single continuous loop
