= Bing's theorem =

Bing's theorem may refer to

- Bing's recognition theorem
- Bing metrization theorem

== See also ==
- R. H. Bing
