= Antoine's necklace =

Embedding of Cantor set in 3-dimensional Euclidean space

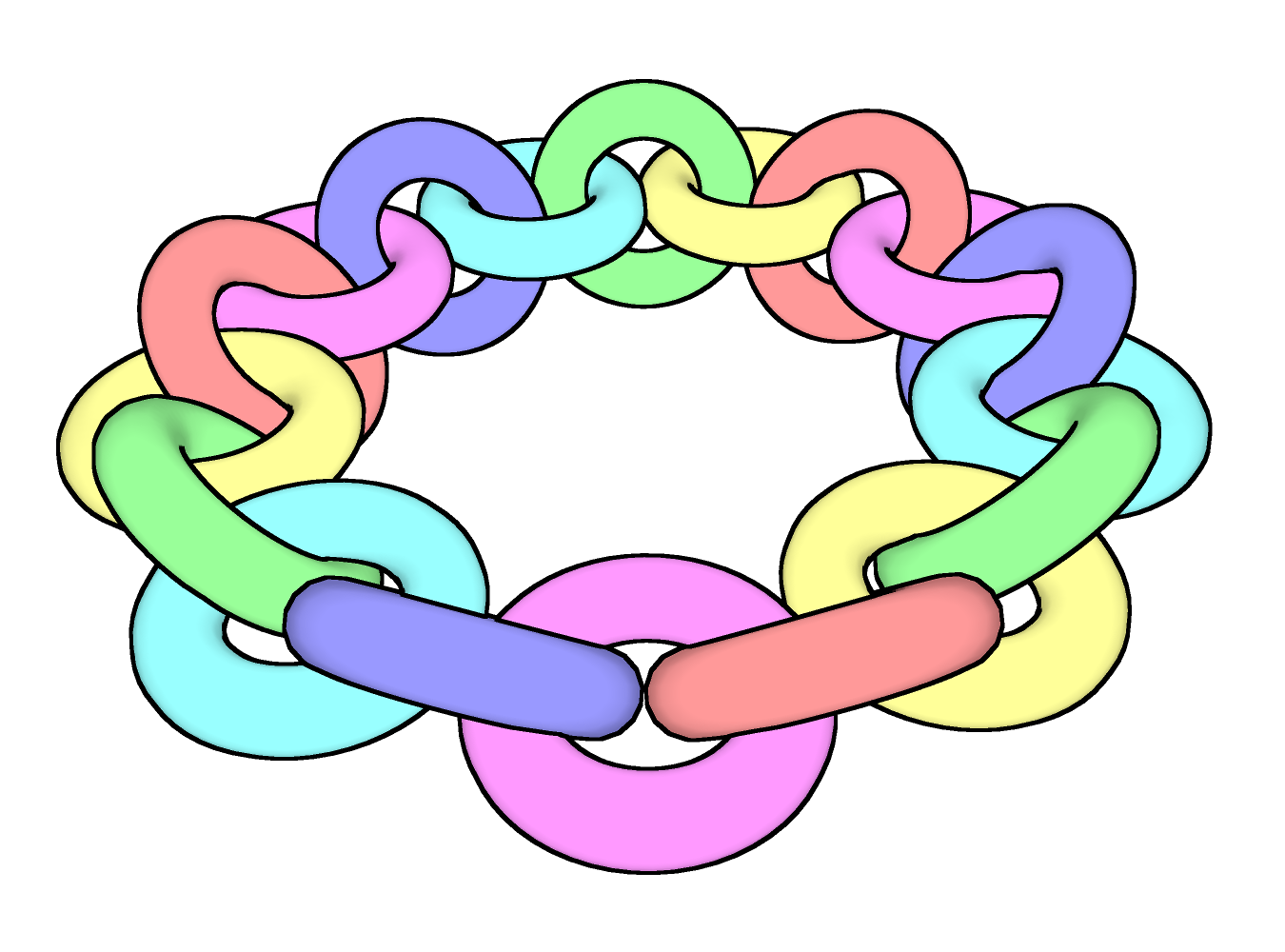
First iteration

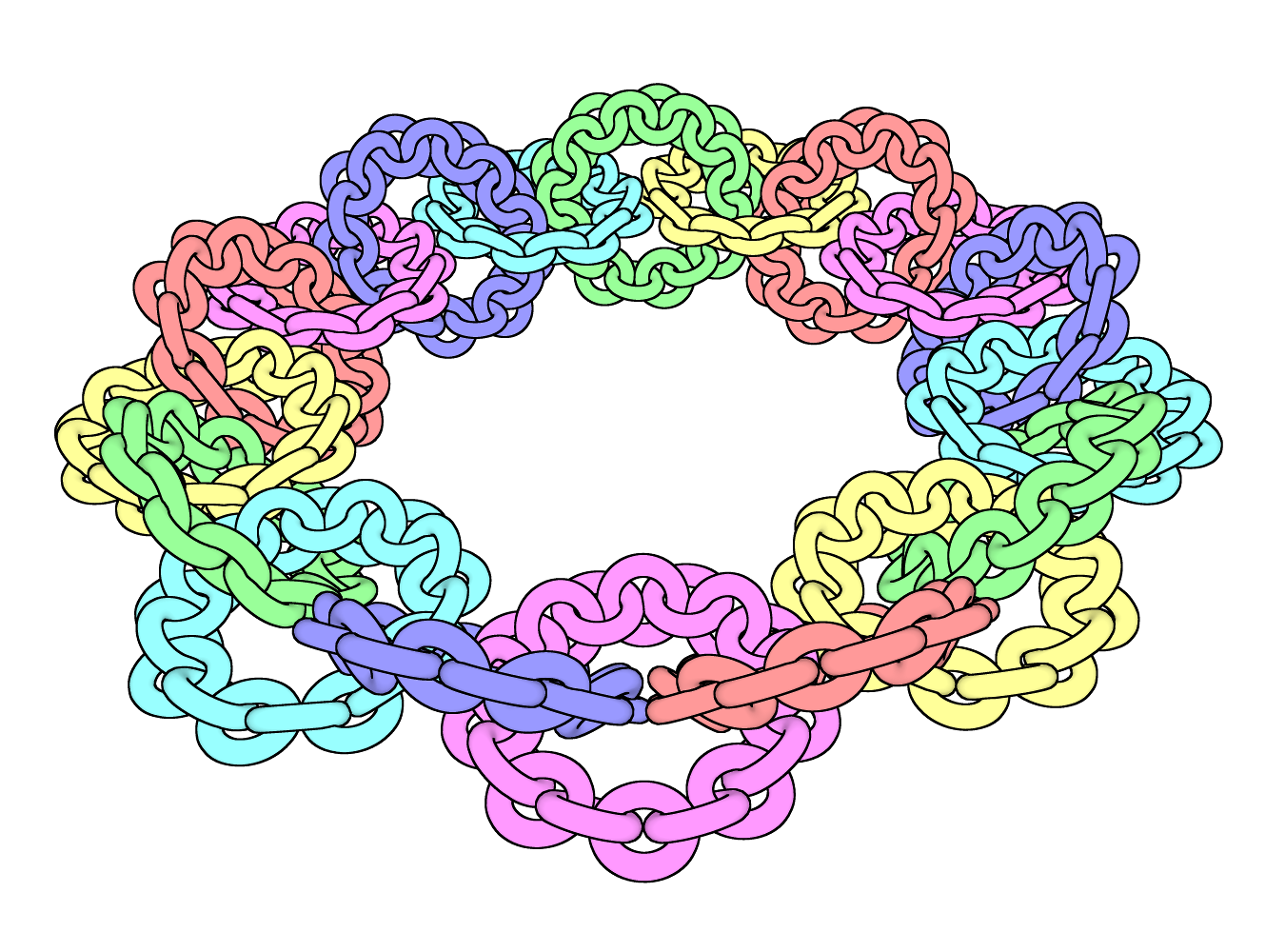
Second iteration

Renderings of Antoine's necklace

In mathematics, Antoine's necklace is a topological embedding of the Cantor set in 3-dimensional Euclidean space, whose complement is not simply connected. It also serves as a counterexample to the claim that all Cantor spaces are ambiently homeomorphic to each other. It was discovered by Louis Antoine (1921).

== Construction ==
Antoine's necklace is constructed iteratively like so: Begin with a solid torus A^{0} (iteration 0). Next, construct a "necklace" of smaller, linked tori that lie inside A^{0}. This necklace is A^{1} (iteration 1). Each torus composing A^{1} can be replaced with another smaller necklace as was done for A^{0}. Doing this yields A^{2} (iteration 2).

This process can be repeated a countably infinite number of times to create an A^{n} for all n. Antoine's necklace A is defined as the intersection of all the iterations.

== Properties ==
Since the solid tori are chosen to become arbitrarily small as the iteration number increases, the connected components of A must be single points. It is then easy to verify that A is closed, dense-in-itself, and totally disconnected, having the cardinality of the continuum. This is sufficient to conclude that as an abstract metric space A is homeomorphic to the Cantor set.

However, as a subset of Euclidean space A is not ambiently homeomorphic to the standard Cantor set C, embedded in R^{3} on a line segment. That is, there is no bi-continuous map from R^{3} → R^{3} that carries C onto A. To show this, suppose there was such a map h : R^{3} → R^{3}, and consider a loop k that is interlocked with the necklace. k cannot be continuously shrunk to a point without touching A because two loops cannot be continuously unlinked. Now consider any loop j disjoint from C. j can be shrunk to a point without touching C because we can simply move it through the gap intervals. However, the loop g = h^{−1}(k) is a loop that cannot be shrunk to a point without touching C, which contradicts the previous statement. Therefore, h cannot exist.

In fact, there is no homeomorphism of R^{3} sending A to a set of Hausdorff dimension < 1, since the complement of such a set must be simply-connected.

Antoine's necklace was used by James Waddell Alexander (1924) to construct Antoine's horned sphere (similar to but not the same as Alexander's horned sphere). This construction can be used to show the existence of uncountably many embeddings of a disk or sphere into three-dimensional space, all inequivalent in terms of ambient isotopy.

== See also ==
- Cantor dust – A generalization of the Cantor set to higher dimensions
- Knaster–Kuratowski fan – Topological space that becomes totally disconnected with the removal of a single point
- List of topologies – List of concrete topologies and topological spaces
- Sierpinski carpet – Plane fractal built from squares
- Whitehead manifold
- Wild knot
- Superhelix
- Hawaiian earring
