= Locally discrete collection =

In mathematics, particularly topology, collections of subsets are said to be locally discrete if they look like they have precisely one element from a local point of view. The study of locally discrete collections is worthwhile as Bing's metrization theorem shows.

== Formal definition ==
Let X be a topological space. A collection {G_{a}} of subsets of X is said to be locally discrete, if each point of the space has a neighbourhood intersecting at most one element of the collection. A collection of subsets of X is said to be countably locally discrete, if it is the countable union of locally discrete collections.

== Properties and examples ==
- Locally discrete collections are by definition locally finite.
- If a collection of subsets of a topological space X is locally discrete, it must satisfy the property that each point of the space belongs to at most one element of the collection. This means that only collections of pairwise disjoint sets can be locally discrete.
- A Hausdorff space cannot have a locally discrete basis unless it is itself discrete. The same property holds for a T_{1} space.
- The following is known as Bing's metrization theorem:
  A space X is metrizable iff it is regular and has a basis that is countably locally discrete.
- A countable collection of sets is necessarily countably locally discrete. Therefore, if X is a metrizable space with a countable basis, one implication of Bing's metrization theorem holds. In fact, Bing's metrization theorem is almost a corollary of the Nagata–Smirnov theorem.
