= Clutching construction =

Topological construct

In topology, a branch of mathematics, the clutching construction is a way of constructing fiber bundles, particularly vector bundles on spheres.

== Definition ==
Consider the sphere $S^n$ as the union of the upper and lower hemispheres $D^n_+$ and $D^n_-$ along their intersection, the equator, an $S^{n-1}$.

Given trivialized fiber bundles with fiber $F$ and structure group $G$ over the two hemispheres, then given a map $f\colon S^{n-1} \to G$ (called the clutching map), glue the two trivial bundles together via f.

Formally, it is the coequalizer of the inclusions $S^{n-1} \times F \to D^n_+ \times F \coprod D^n_- \times F$ via $(x,v) \mapsto (x,v) \in D^n_+ \times F$ and $(x,v) \mapsto (x,f(x)(v)) \in D^n_- \times F$: glue the two bundles together on the boundary, with a twist.

Thus we have a map $\pi_{n-1} G \to \text{Fib}_F(S^n)$: clutching information on the equator yields a fiber bundle on the total space.

In the case of vector bundles, this yields $\pi_{n-1} O(k) \to \text{Vect}_k(S^n)$, and indeed this map is an isomorphism (under connected sum of spheres on the right).

== Generalization ==
The above can be generalized by replacing $D^n_\pm$ and $S^n$ with any closed triad $(X;A,B)$, that is, a space X, together with two closed subsets A and B whose union is X. Then a clutching map on $A \cap B$ gives a vector bundle on X.

== Classifying map construction ==
Let $p \colon M \to N$ be a fibre bundle with fibre $F$. Let $\mathcal U$ be a collection of pairs $(U_i,q_i)$ such that $q_i \colon p^{-1}(U_i) \to N \times F$ is a local trivialization of $p$ over $U_i \subset N$. Moreover, we demand that the union of all the sets $U_i$ is $N$ (i.e. the collection is an atlas of trivializations $\coprod_i U_i = N$).

Consider the space $\coprod_i U_i\times F$ modulo the equivalence relation $(u_i,f_i)\in U_i \times F$ is equivalent to $(u_j,f_j)\in U_j \times F$ if and only if $U_i \cap U_j \neq \varnothing$ and $q_i \circ q_j^{-1}(u_j,f_j) = (u_i,f_i)$. By design, the local trivializations $q_i$ give a fibrewise equivalence between this quotient space and the fibre bundle $p$.

Consider the space $\coprod_i U_i\times \operatorname{Homeo}(F)$ modulo the equivalence relation $(u_i,h_i)\in U_i \times \operatorname{Homeo}(F)$ is equivalent to $(u_j,h_j)\in U_j \times \operatorname{Homeo}(F)$ if and only if $U_i \cap U_j \neq \varnothing$ and consider $q_i \circ q_j^{-1}$ to be a map $q_i \circ q_j^{-1} : U_i \cap U_j \to \operatorname{Homeo}(F)$ then we demand that $q_i \circ q_j^{-1}(u_j)(h_j)=h_i$. That is, in our re-construction of $p$ we are replacing the fibre $F$ by the topological group of homeomorphisms of the fibre, $\operatorname{Homeo}(F)$. If the structure group of the bundle is known to reduce, you could replace $\operatorname{Homeo}(F)$ with the reduced structure group. This is a bundle over $N$ with fibre $\operatorname{Homeo}(F)$ and is a principal bundle. Denote it by $p \colon M_p \to N$. The relation to the previous bundle is induced from the principal bundle: $(M_p \times F)/\operatorname{Homeo}(F) = M$.

So we have a principal bundle $\operatorname{Homeo}(F) \to M_p \to N$. The theory of classifying spaces gives us an induced push-forward fibration $M_p \to N \to B(\operatorname{Homeo}(F))$ where $B(\operatorname{Homeo}(F))$ is the classifying space of $\operatorname{Homeo}(F)$. Here is an outline:

Given a $G$-principal bundle $G \to M_p \to N$, consider the space $M_p \times_{G} EG$. This space is a fibration in two different ways:

1) Project onto the first factor: $M_p \times_G EG \to M_p/G = N$. The fibre in this case is $EG$, which is a contractible space by the definition of a classifying space.

2) Project onto the second factor: $M_p \times_G EG \to EG/G = BG$. The fibre in this case is $M_p$.

Thus we have a fibration $M_p \to N \simeq M_p\times_G EG \to BG$. This map is called the classifying map of the fibre bundle $p \colon M \to N$ since 1) the principal bundle $G \to M_p \to N$ is the pull-back of the bundle $G \to EG \to BG$ along the classifying map and 2) The bundle $p$ is induced from the principal bundle as above.

== Contrast with twisted spheres ==
Twisted spheres are sometimes referred to as a "clutching-type" construction, but this is misleading: the clutching construction is properly about fiber bundles.

- In twisted spheres, you glue two halves along their boundary. The halves are a priori identified (with the standard ball), and points on the boundary sphere do not in general go to their corresponding points on the other boundary sphere. This is a map $S^{n-1} \to S^{n-1}$: the gluing is non-trivial in the base.
- In the clutching construction, you glue two bundles together over the boundary of their base hemispheres. The boundary spheres are glued together via the standard identification: each point goes to the corresponding one, but each fiber has a twist. This is a map $S^{n-1} \to G$: the gluing is trivial in the base, but not in the fibers.

== Examples ==
The clutching construction is used to form the chiral anomaly, by gluing together a pair of self-dual curvature forms. Such forms are locally exact on each hemisphere, as they are differentials of the Chern–Simons 3-form; by gluing them together, the curvature form is no longer globally exact (and so has a non-trivial homotopy group $\pi_3.$)

Similar constructions can be found for various instantons, including the Wess–Zumino–Witten model.

== See also ==
- Alexander trick
