= Schoenflies problem =

Extends the Jordan curve theorem to characterize the inner and outer regions

In mathematics, the Schoenflies problem or Schoenflies theorem, of geometric topology is a sharpening of the Jordan curve theorem by Arthur Schoenflies. For Jordan curves in the plane it is often referred to as the Jordan–Schoenflies theorem.

== Original formulation ==
The original formulation of the Schoenflies problem states that not only does every simple closed curve in the plane separate the plane into two regions, one (the "inside") bounded and the other (the "outside") unbounded; but also that these two regions are homeomorphic to the inside and outside of a standard circle in the plane.

An alternative statement is that if $C \subset \mathbb R^2$ is a simple closed curve, then there is a homeomorphism $f : \mathbb R^2 \to \mathbb R^2$ such that $f(C)$ is the unit circle in the plane. Elementary proofs can be found in Newman (1939), Cairns (1951), Moise (1977) and Thomassen (1992). The result can first be proved for polygons when the homeomorphism can be taken to be piecewise linear and the identity map off some compact set; the case of a continuous curve is then deduced by approximating by polygons. The theorem is also an immediate consequence of Carathéodory's extension theorem for conformal mappings, as discussed in Pommerenke (1992, p. 25).

If the curve is smooth then the homeomorphism can be chosen to be a diffeomorphism. Proofs in this case rely on techniques from differential topology. Although direct proofs are possible (starting for example from the polygonal case), existence of the diffeomorphism can also be deduced by using the smooth Riemann mapping theorem for the interior and exterior of the curve in combination with the Alexander trick for diffeomorphisms of the circle and a result on smooth isotopy from differential topology.

Such a theorem is valid only in two dimensions. In three dimensions there are counterexamples such as Alexander's horned sphere. Although they separate space into two regions, those regions are so twisted and knotted that they are not homeomorphic to the inside and outside of a normal sphere.

== Proofs of the Jordan–Schoenflies theorem ==
For smooth or polygonal curves, the Jordan curve theorem can be proved in a straightforward way. Indeed, the curve has a tubular neighbourhood, defined in the smooth case by the field of unit normal vectors to the curve or in the polygonal case by points at a distance of less than ε from the curve. In a neighbourhood of a differentiable point on the curve, there is a coordinate change in which the curve becomes the diameter of an open disk. Taking a point not on the curve, a straight line aimed at the curve starting at the point will eventually meet the tubular neighborhood; the path can be continued next to the curve until it meets the disk. It will meet it on one side or the other. This proves that the complement of the curve has at most two connected components. On the other hand, using the Cauchy integral formula for the winding number, it can be seen that the winding number is constant on connected components of the complement of the curve, is zero near infinity and increases by 1 when crossing the curve. Hence the curve separates the plane into exactly two components, its "interior" and its "exterior", the latter being unbounded. The same argument works for a piecewise differentiable Jordan curve.

=== Polygonal curve ===
Given a simple closed polygonal curve in the plane, the piecewise linear Jordan–Schoenflies theorem states that there is a piecewise linear homeomorphism of the plane, with compact support, carrying the polygon onto a triangle and taking the interior and exterior of one onto the interior and exterior of the other.

The interior of the polygon can be triangulated by small triangles, so that the edges of the polygon form edges of some of the small triangles. Piecewise linear homeomorphisms can be made up from special homeomorphisms obtained by removing a diamond from the plane and taking a piecewise affine map, fixing the edges of the diamond, but moving one diagonal into a V shape. Compositions of homeomorphisms of this kind give rise to piecewise linear homeomorphisms of compact support; they fix the outside of a polygon and act in an affine way on a triangulation of the interior. A simple inductive argument shows that it is always possible to remove a free triangle—one for which the intersection with the boundary is a connected set made up of one or two edges—leaving a simple closed Jordan polygon. The special homeomorphisms described above or their inverses provide piecewise linear homeomorphisms which carry the interior of the larger polygon onto the polygon with the free triangle removed. Iterating this process it follows that there is a piecewise linear homeomorphism of compact support carrying the original polygon onto a triangle.

Because the homeomorphism is obtained by composing finite many homeomorphisms of the plane of compact support, it follows that the piecewise linear homeomorphism in the statement of the piecewise linear Jordan-Schoenflies theorem has compact support.

As a corollary, it follows that any homeomorphism between simple closed polygonal curves extends to a homeomorphism between their interiors. For each polygon there is a homeomorphism of a given triangle onto the closure of their interior. The three homeomorphisms yield a single homeomorphism of the boundary of the triangle. By the Alexander trick this homeomorphism can be extended to a homeomorphism of closure of interior of the triangle. Reversing this process this homeomorphism yields a homeomorphism between the closures of the interiors of the polygonal curves.

=== Continuous curve ===
The Jordan-Schoenflies theorem for continuous curves can be proved using Carathéodory's theorem on conformal mapping. It states that the Riemann mapping between the interior of a simple Jordan curve and the open unit disk extends continuously to a homeomorphism between their closures, mapping the Jordan curve homeomorphically onto the unit circle. To prove the theorem, Carathéodory's theorem can be applied to the two regions on the Riemann sphere defined by the Jordan curve. This will result in homeomorphisms between their closures and the closed disks |z| ≤ 1 and |z| ≥ 1. The homeomorphisms from the Jordan curve to the circle will differ by a homeomorphism of the circle which can be extended to the unit disk (or its complement) by the Alexander trick. Composition with this homeomorphism will yield a pair of homeomorphisms which match on the Jordan curve and therefore define a homeomorphism of the Riemann sphere carrying the Jordan curve onto the unit circle.

The continuous case can also be deduced from the polygonal case by approximating the continuous curve by a polygon. The Jordan curve theorem is first deduced by this method. The Jordan curve is given by a continuous function on the unit circle. It and the inverse function from its image back to the unit circle are uniformly continuous. So dividing the circle up into small enough intervals, there are points on the curve such that the line segments joining adjacent points lie close to the curve, say by ε. Together these line segments form a polygonal curve. If it has self-intersections, these must also create polygonal loops. Erasing these loops, results in a polygonal curve without self-intersections which still lies close to the curve; some of its vertices might not lie on the curve, but they all lie within a neighbourhood of the curve. The polygonal curve divides the plane into two regions, one bounded region U and one unbounded region V. Both U and V ∪ ∞ are continuous images of the closed unit disk. Since the original curve is contained within a small neighbourhood of the polygonal curve, the union of the images of slightly smaller concentric open disks entirely misses the original curve and their union excludes a small neighbourhood of the curve. One of the images is a bounded open set consisting of points around which the curve has winding number one; the other is an unbounded open set consisting of points of winding number zero. Repeating for a sequence of values of ε tending to 0, leads to a union of open path-connected bounded sets of points of winding number one and a union of open path-connected unbounded sets of winding number zero. By construction these two disjoint open path-connected sets fill out the complement of the curve in the plane.

Hexagonal tessellation of the plane: if 2 hexagons meet they must have a common edge

A standard brickwork tiling of the plane

Given the Jordan curve theorem, the Jordan-Schoenflies theorem can be proved as follows.

- The first step is to show that a dense set of points on the curve are accessible from the inside of the curve, i.e. they are at the end of a line segment lying entirely in the interior of the curve. In fact, a given point on the curve is arbitrarily close to some point in the interior and there is a smallest closed disk about that point which intersects the curve only on its boundary; those boundary points are close to the original point on the curve and by construction are accessible.
- The second step is to prove that given finitely many accessible points A_{i} on the curve connected to line segments A_{i}B_{i} in its interior, there are disjoint polygonal curves in the interior with vertices on each of the line segments such that their distance to the original curve is arbitrarily small. This requires tessellations of the plane by uniformly small tiles such that if two tiles meet they have a side or a segment of a side in common: examples are the standard hexagonal tessellation; or the standard brickwork tiling by rectangles or squares with common or stretch bonds. It suffices to construct a polygonal path so that its distance to the Jordan curve is arbitrarily small. Orient the tessellation such no side of a tiles is parallel to any A_{i}B_{i}. The size of the tiles can be taken arbitrarily small. Take the union of all the closed tiles containing at least one point of the Jordan curve. Its boundary is made up of disjoint polygonal curves. If the size of the tiles is sufficiently small, the endpoints B_{i} will lie in the interior of exactly one of the polygonal boundary curves. Its distance to the Jordan curve is less than twice the diameter of the tiles, so is arbitrarily small.
- The third step is to prove that any homeomorphism f between the curve and a given triangle can be extended to a homeomorphism between the closures of their interiors. In fact take a sequence ε_{1}, ε_{2}, ε_{3}, ... decreasing to zero. Choose finitely many points A_{i} on the Jordan curve Γ with successive points less than ε_{1} apart. Make the construction of the second step with tiles of diameter less than ε_{1} and take C_{i} to be the points on the polygonal curve Γ_{1} intersecting A_{i}B_{i}. Take the points f(A_{i}) on the triangle. Fix an origin in the triangle Δ and scale the triangle to get a smaller one Δ_{1} at a distance less than ε_{1} from the original triangle. Let D_{i} be the points at the intersection of the radius through f(A_{i}) and the smaller triangle. There is a piecewise linear homeomorphism F_{1} of the polygonal curve onto the smaller triangle carrying C_{i} onto D_{i}. By the Jordan-Schoenflies theorem it extends to a homeomorphism F_{1} between the closure of their interiors. Now carry out the same process for ε_{2} with a new set of points on the Jordan curve. This will produce a second polygonal path Γ_{2} between Γ_{1} and Γ. There is likewise a second triangle Δ_{2} between Δ_{1} and Δ. The line segments for the accessible points on Γ divide the polygonal region between Γ_{2} and Γ_{1} into a union of polygonal regions; similarly for radii for the corresponding points on Δ divides the region between Δ_{2} and Δ_{1} into a union of polygonal regions. The homeomorphism F_{1} can be extended to homeomorphisms between the different polygons, agreeing on common edges (closed intervals on line segments or radii). By the polygonal Jordan-Schoenflies theorem, each of these homeomorphisms extends to the interior of the polygon. Together they yield a homeomorphism F_{2} of the closure of the interior of Γ_{2} onto the closure of the interior of Δ_{2}; F_{2} extends F_{1}. Continuing in this way produces polygonal curves Γ_{n} and triangles Δ_{n} with a homomeomorphism F_{n} between the closures of their interiors; F_{n} extends F_{n – 1}. The regions inside the Γ_{n} increase to the region inside Γ; and the triangles Δ_{n} increase to Δ. The homeomorphisms F_{n} patch together to give a homeomorphism F from the interior of Γ onto the interior of Δ. By construction it has limit f on the boundary curves Γ and Δ. Hence F is the required homeomorphism.
- The fourth step is to prove that any homeomorphism between Jordan curves can be extended to a homeomorphism between the closures of their interiors. By the result of the third step, it is sufficient to show that any homeomorphism of the boundary of a triangle extends to a homeomorphism of the closure of its interior. This is a consequence of the Alexander trick. (The Alexander trick also establishes a homeomorphism between the solid triangle and the closed disk: the homeomorphism is just the natural radial extension of the projection of the triangle onto its circumcircle with respect to its circumcentre.)
- The final step is to prove that given two Jordan curves there is a homeomorphism of the plane of compact support carrying one curve onto the other. In fact each Jordan curve lies inside the same large circle and in the interior of each large circle there are radii joining two diagonally opposite points to the curve. Each configuration divide the plane into the exterior of the large circle, the interior of the Jordan curve and the region between the two into two bounded regions bounded by Jordan curves (formed of two radii, a semicircle, and one of the halves of the Jordan curve). Take the identity homeomorphism of the large circle; piecewise linear homeomorphisms between the two pairs of radii; and a homeomorphism between the two pairs of halves of the Jordan curves given by a linear reparametrization. The 4 homeomorphisms patch together on the boundary arcs to yield a homeomorphism of the plane given by the identity off the large circle and carrying one Jordan curve onto the other.

=== Smooth curve ===
Proofs in the smooth case depend on finding a diffeomorphism between the interior/exterior of the curve and the closed unit disk (or its complement in the extended plane). This can be solved for example by using the smooth Riemann mapping theorem, for which a number of direct methods are available, for example through the Dirichlet problem on the curve or Bergman kernels. (Such diffeomorphisms will be holomorphic on the interior and exterior of the curve; more general diffeomorphisms can be constructed more easily using vector fields and flows.) Regarding the smooth curve as lying inside the extended plane or 2-sphere, these analytic methods produce smooth maps up to the boundary between the closure of the interior/exterior of the smooth curve and those of the unit circle. The two identifications of the smooth curve and the unit circle will differ by a diffeomorphism of the unit circle. On the other hand, a diffeomorphism f of the unit circle can be extended to a diffeomorphism F of the unit disk by the Alexander extension:

$$\displaystyle{F(r e^{i\theta})= r \exp [i\psi(r)g(\theta) + i(1-\psi(r))\theta],}$$

where ψ is a smooth function with values in [0,1], equal to 0 near 0 and 1 near 1, and f(e^{iθ}) = e^{ig(θ)}, with g(θ + 2π) = g(θ) + 2π. Composing one of the diffeomorphisms with the Alexander extension allows the two diffeomorphisms to be patched together to give a homeomorphism of the 2-sphere which restricts to a diffeomorphism on the closed unit disk and the closures of its complement which it carries onto the interior and exterior of the original smooth curve. By the isotopy theorem in differential topology, the homeomorphism can be adjusted to a diffeomorphism on the whole 2-sphere without changing it on the unit circle. This diffeomorphism then provides the smooth solution to the Schoenflies problem.

The Jordan-Schoenflies theorem can be deduced using differential topology. In fact it is an immediate consequence of the classification up to diffeomorphism of smooth oriented 2-manifolds with boundary, as described in Hirsch (1994). Indeed, the smooth curve divides the 2-sphere into two parts. By the classification each is diffeomorphic to the unit disk and—taking into account the isotopy theorem—they are glued together by a diffeomorphism of the boundary. By the Alexander trick, such a diffeomorphism extends to the disk itself. Thus there is a diffeomorphism of the 2-sphere carrying the smooth curve onto the unit circle.

On the other hand, the diffeomorphism can also be constructed directly using the Jordan-Schoenflies theorem for polygons and elementary methods from differential topology, namely flows defined by vector fields. When the Jordan curve is smooth (parametrized by arc length) the unit normal vectors give a non-vanishing vector field X_{0} in a tubular neighbourhood U_{0} of the curve. Take a polygonal curve in the interior of the curve close to the boundary and transverse to the curve (at the vertices the vector field should be strictly within the angle formed by the edges). By the piecewise linear Jordan–Schoenflies theorem, there is a piecewise linear homeomorphism, affine on an appropriate triangulation of the interior of the polygon, taking the polygon onto a triangle. Take an interior point P in one of the small triangles of the triangulation. It corresponds to a point Q in the image triangle. There is a radial vector field on the image triangle, formed of straight lines pointing towards Q. This gives a series of lines in the small triangles making up the polygon. Each defines a vector field X_{i} on a neighbourhood U_{i} of the closure of the triangle. Each vector field is transverse to the sides, provided that Q is chosen in "general position" so that it is not collinear with any of the finitely many edges in the triangulation. Translating if necessary, it can be assumed that P and Q are at the origin 0. On the triangle containing P the vector field can be taken to be the standard radial vector field. Similarly the same procedure can be applied to the outside of the smooth curve, after applying Möbius transformation to map it into the finite part of the plane and ∞ to 0. In this case the neighbourhoods U_{i} of the triangles have negative indices. Take the vector fields X_{i} with a negative sign, pointing away from the point at infinity. Together U_{0} and the U_{i}'s with i ≠ 0 form an open cover of the 2-sphere. Take a smooth partition of unity ψ_{i} subordinate to the cover U_{i} and set

$$\displaystyle{X=\sum \psi_i\cdot X_i.}$$

X is a smooth vector field on the two sphere vanishing only at 0 and ∞. It has index 1 at 0 and -1 at ∞. Near 0 the vector field equals the radial vector field pointing towards 0. If α_{t} is the smooth flow defined by X, the point 0 is an attracting point and ∞ a repelling point. As t tends to +∞, the flow send points to 0; while as t tends to –∞ points are sent to ∞. Replacing X by f⋅X with f a smooth positive function, changes the parametrization of the integral curves of X, but not the integral curves themselves. For an appropriate choice of f equal to 1 outside a small annulus near 0, the integral curves starting at points of the smooth curve will all reach smaller circle bounding the annulus at the same time s. The diffeomorphism α_{s} therefore carries the smooth curve onto this small circle. A scaling transformation, fixing 0 and ∞, then carries the small circle onto the unit circle. Composing these diffeomorphisms gives a diffeomorphism carrying the smooth curve onto the unit circle.

== Generalizations ==
There does exist a higher-dimensional generalization due to Morton Brown (1960) and independently Barry Mazur (1959) with Morse (1960), which is also called the generalized Schoenflies theorem. It states that, if an (n − 1)-dimensional sphere S is embedded into the n-dimensional sphere S^{n} in a locally flat way (that is, the embedding extends to that of a thickened sphere), then the pair (S^{n}, S) is homeomorphic to the pair (S^{n}, S^{n−1}), where S^{n−1} is the equator of the n-sphere. Brown and Mazur received the Veblen Prize for their contributions. Both the Brown and Mazur proofs are considered "elementary" and use inductive arguments.

The Schoenflies problem can be posed in categories other than the topologically locally flat category, i.e. does a smoothly (piecewise-linearly) embedded (n − 1)-sphere in the n-sphere bound a smooth (piecewise-linear) n-ball? For n = 4, the problem is still open for both categories. See Mazur manifold. For n ≥ 5 the question in the smooth category has an affirmative answer, and follows from the h-cobordism theorem.
