= Mazur manifold =

Concept in differential topology

In differential topology, a branch of mathematics, a Mazur manifold is a contractible, compact, smooth four-dimensional manifold-with-boundary which is not diffeomorphic to the standard 4-ball. Usually these manifolds are further required to have a handle decomposition with a single $1$-handle, and a single $2$-handle; otherwise, they would simply be called contractible manifolds. The boundary of a Mazur manifold is necessarily a homology 3-sphere.

== History ==
Barry Mazur and Valentin Poénaru discovered these manifolds simultaneously. Selman Akbulut and Robion Kirby showed that the Brieskorn homology spheres $\Sigma(2,5,7)$, $\Sigma(3,4,5)$, and $\Sigma(2,3,13)$ are boundaries of Mazur manifolds, effectively coining the term `Mazur Manifold.' These results were later generalized to other contractible manifolds by Andrew Casson, John Harer, and Ronald Stern. One of the Mazur manifolds is also an example of an Akbulut cork which can be used to construct exotic 4-manifolds.

Mazur manifolds have been used by Ronald Fintushel and Stern to construct exotic actions of a group of order 2 on the 4-sphere.

Mazur's discovery was surprising for several reasons:

- Every smooth homology sphere in dimension $n \geq 5$ is homeomorphic to the boundary of a compact contractible smooth manifold. This follows from the work of Michel Kervaire and the h-cobordism theorem. Slightly more strongly, every smooth homology 4-sphere is diffeomorphic to the boundary of a compact contractible smooth 5-manifold (also by the work of Kervaire). But not every homology 3-sphere is diffeomorphic to the boundary of a contractible compact smooth 4-manifold. For example, the Poincaré homology sphere does not bound such a 4-manifold because the Rokhlin invariant provides an obstruction.

- The h-cobordism Theorem implies that, at least in dimensions $n \geq 6$ there is a unique contractible $n$-manifold with simply-connected boundary, where uniqueness is up to diffeomorphism. This manifold is the unit ball $D^n$. It's an open problem as to whether or not $D^5$ admits an exotic smooth structure, but by the h-cobordism theorem, such an exotic smooth structure, if it exists, must restrict to an exotic smooth structure on $S^4$. Whether or not $S^4$ admits an exotic smooth structure is equivalent to another open problem, the smooth Poincaré conjecture in dimension four. Whether or not $D^4$ admits an exotic smooth structure is another open problem, closely linked to the Schoenflies problem in dimension four.

== Mazur's observation ==
Let $M$ be a Mazur manifold that is constructed as $S^1 \times D^3$ union a 2-handle. Here is a sketch of Mazur's argument that the double of such a Mazur manifold is $S^4$. $M \times [0,1]$ is a contractible 5-manifold constructed as $S^1 \times D^4$ union a 2-handle. The 2-handle can be unknotted since the attaching map is a framed knot in the 4-manifold $S^1 \times S^3$. So $S^1 \times D^4$ union the 2-handle is diffeomorphic to $D^5$. The boundary of $D^5$ is $S^4$. But the boundary of $M \times [0,1]$ is the double of $M$.
