= SCARA =

Type of industrial robotic arm

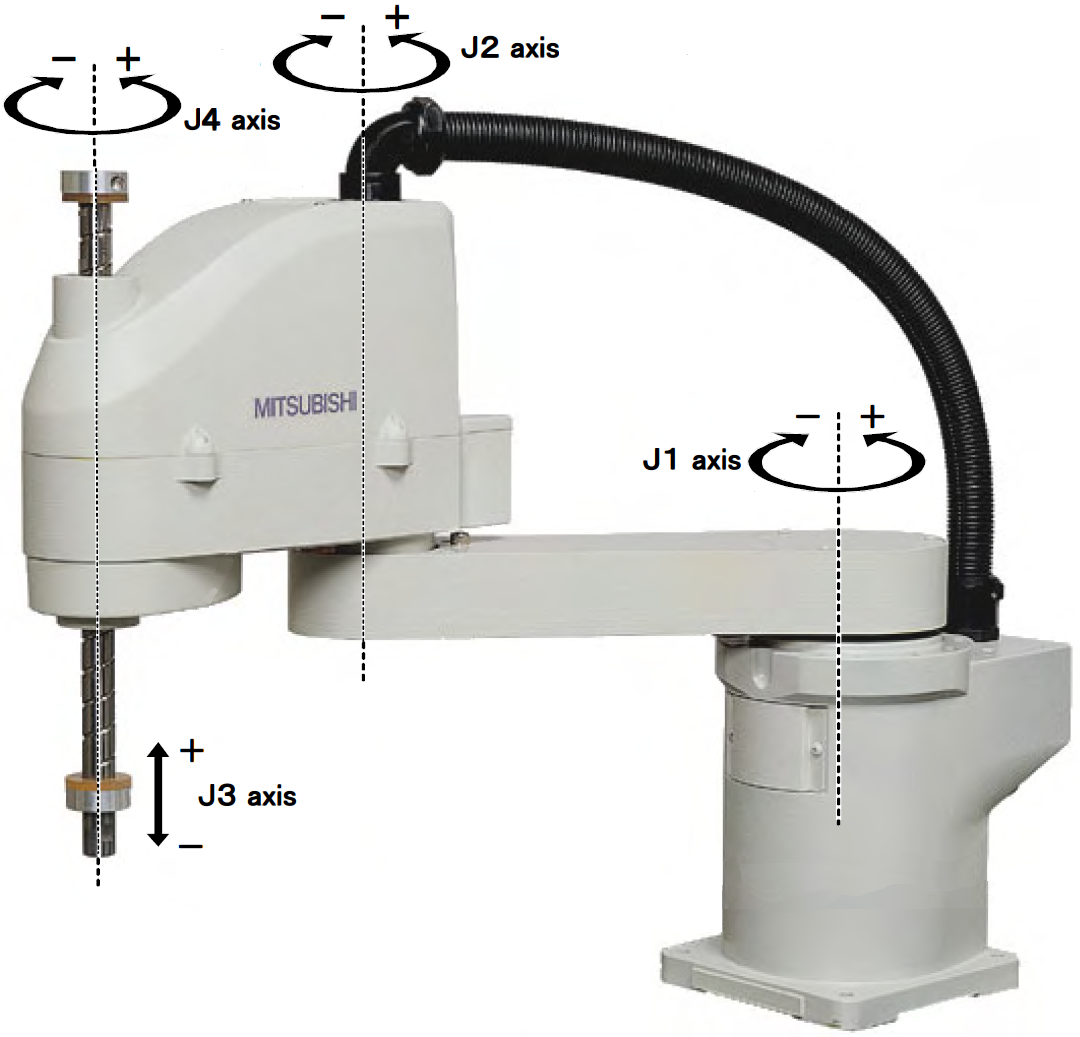
Serial SCARA robot

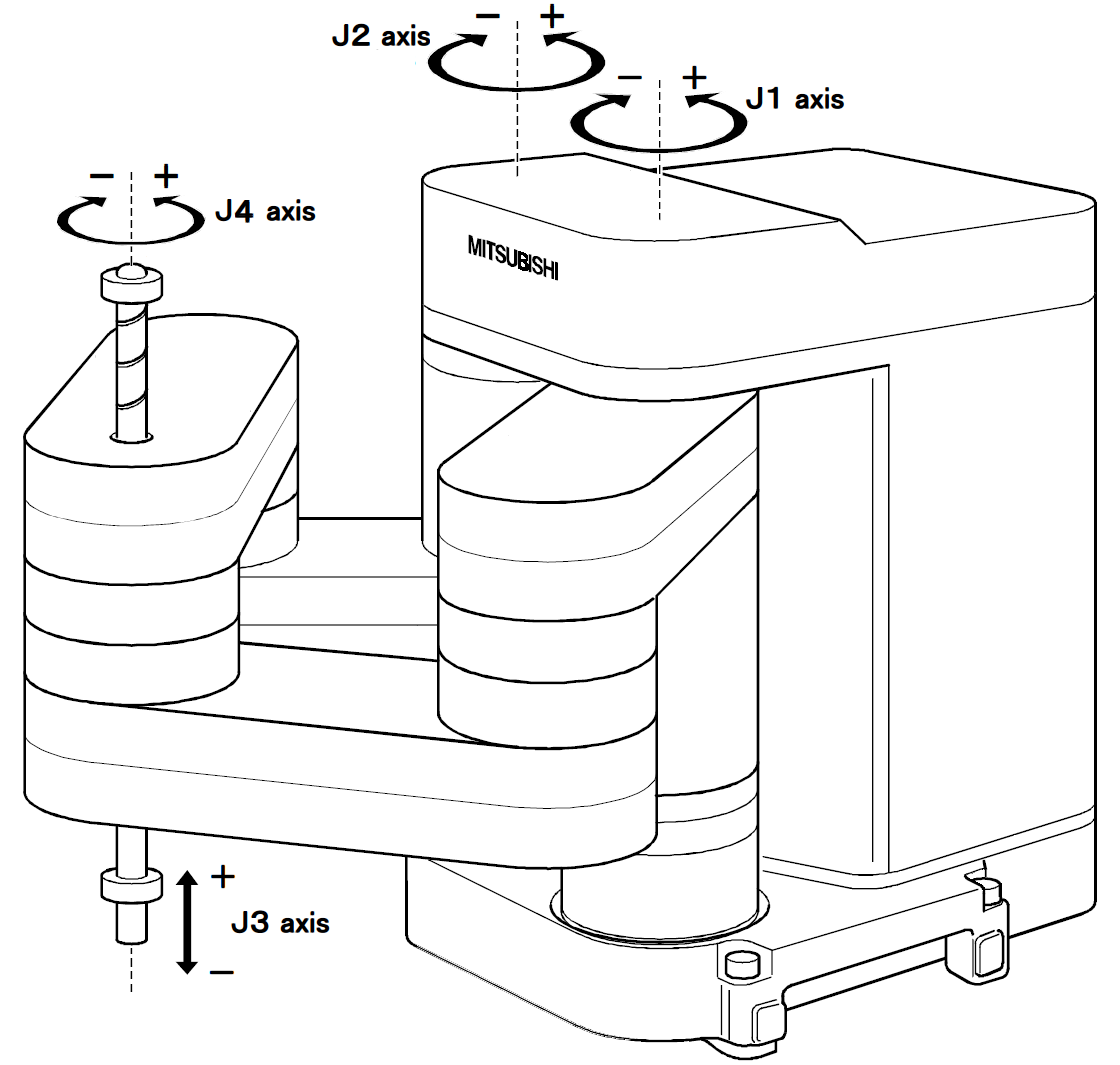
Parallel SCARA robot

The SCARA is a type of industrial robot. The acronym stands for selective compliance assembly robot arm or selective compliance articulated robot arm.

By virtue of the SCARA's parallel-axis joint layout, the arm is slightly compliant in the X-Y direction but rigid in the Z direction, hence the term selective compliance. This is advantageous for many types of assembly operations, for example, inserting a round pin in a round hole without binding.

The second attribute of the SCARA is the jointed two-link arm layout similar to human arms, hence the often-used term, articulated. This feature allows the arm to extend into confined areas and then retract or "fold up" out of the way. This is advantageous for transferring parts from one cell to another or for loading or unloading process stations that are enclosed.

SCARAs are generally faster than comparable Cartesian robot systems. Their single pedestal mount requires a small footprint and provides an easy, unhindered form of mounting. On the other hand, SCARAs can be more expensive than comparable Cartesian systems and the controlling software requires inverse kinematics for linear interpolated moves.

Sankyo Seiki, Pentel and NEC presented the SCARA robot as a completely new concept for assembly robots in 1981. The robot was developed under the guidance of Hiroshi Makino, a professor at the University of Yamanashi. Its arm was rigid in the Z-axis and pliable in the XY-axes, which allowed it to adapt to holes in the XY-axes.

== History ==
The SCARA robot concept was inspired by the presentation of the SIGMA robot for assembly by A. d'Auria at the 7th International Symposium on Robotics in Tokyo, in October 1977. This presentation had a significant impact on engineers in Japan studying assembly automation, prompting Hiroshi Makino to begin working on the SCARA robot design shortly after this event.

The first SCARA prototype was built in 1978, followed by a second prototype in 1980. Fundamental studies were conducted on the characteristics and usability of these prototypes, which led to the development of SCARA robots by the industry in 1981.

The development of SCARA robots was the result of a research and development consortium launched by the University of Yamanashi and thirteen Japanese companies. This consortium operated for three years, from April 1978 to March 1981, contributing to the success of SCARA robots in industrial applications.

As recognition of its importance in the field of robotics, the SCARA robot was included in the Robot Hall of Fame in 2006, becoming the second industrial robot and the third Japanese robot to be included.

== Gallery ==
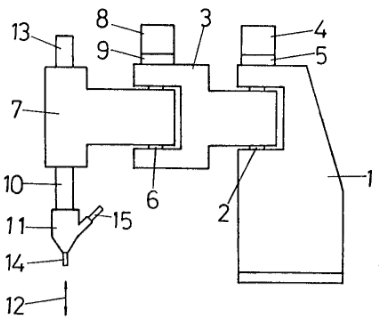
Drawing from patent JPS55112789A by H. Makino

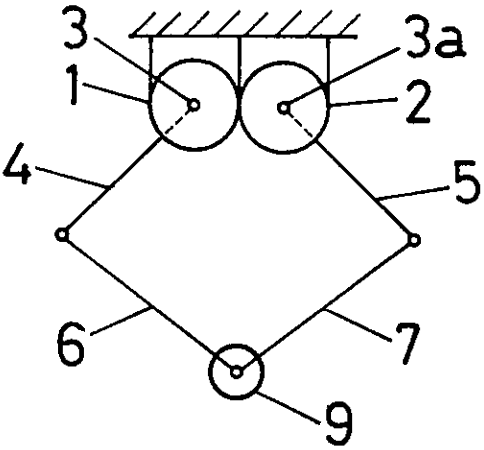
Drawing from patent US4341502 by H. Makino

== See also ==
- Articulated robot
- Schoenflies displacement
