= Schoenflies displacement =

Schoenflies (or Schönflies) displacement (or motion) named after Arthur Moritz Schoenflies is a rigid body motion consisting of linear motion in three dimensional space plus one orientation around an axis with fixed direction. In robotic manipulation this is a common motion as many pick and place operations require moving an object from one plane and placing it with a different orientation onto another parallel plane (e.g., placement of components on a circuit board). These robots are commonly called Schoenflies-motion generators.

Because the SCARA manipulator was one of the first manipulators providing similar motion, this is often referred to as SCARA-type motion. Today, many robotic manipulators, including some with parallel kinematic architecture, are used in industry for applications ranging from the manufacture of electronics to food processing and packaging industry.

== See also ==
- Articulated robot
- Parallel manipulator
- SCARA
- Delta robot
