= Collapse (topology) =

In topology, a branch of mathematics, a collapse reduces a simplicial complex (or more generally, a CW complex) to a homotopy-equivalent subcomplex. Collapses, like CW complexes themselves, were invented by J. H. C. Whitehead. Collapses find applications in computational homology.

== Definition ==
Let $K$ be an abstract simplicial complex.

Suppose that $\tau, \sigma$ are two simplices of $K$ such that the following two conditions are satisfied:

1. $\tau \subsetneq \sigma,$ in particular $\dim \tau < \dim \sigma;$
2. $\sigma$ is a maximal face of $K$ and no other maximal face of $K$ contains $\tau,$

then $\tau$ is called a free face.

A simplicial collapse of $K$ is the removal of all simplices $\gamma$ such that $\tau \subseteq \gamma \subseteq \sigma,$ where $\tau$ is a free face. If additionally we have $\dim \tau = \dim \sigma - 1,$ then this is called an elementary collapse.

A simplicial complex that has a sequence of collapses leading to a point is called collapsible. Every collapsible complex is contractible, but the converse is not true.

This definition can be extended to CW-complexes and is the basis for the concept of simple-homotopy equivalence.

== Examples ==
- Complexes that do not have a free face cannot be collapsible. Two such interesting examples are R. H. Bing's house with two rooms and Christopher Zeeman's dunce hat; they are contractible (homotopy equivalent to a point), but not collapsible.
- Any n-dimensional PL manifold that is collapsible is in fact piecewise-linearly isomorphic to an n-ball.

== See also ==
- Discrete Morse theory
- Shelling (topology) – Mathematical concept
