= Neat submanifold =

In differential topology, an area of mathematics, a neat submanifold of a manifold with boundary is a kind of "well-behaved" submanifold.

To define this more precisely, first let

$M$ be a manifold with boundary, and
$A$ be a submanifold of $M$.

Then $A$ is said to be a neat submanifold of $M$ if it meets the following two conditions:

- The boundary of $A$ is a subset of the boundary of $M$. That is, $\partial A \subset \partial M$.
- Each point of $A$ has a neighborhood within which $A$'s embedding in $M$ is equivalent to the embedding of a hyperplane in a higher-dimensional Euclidean space.

More formally, $A$ must be covered by charts $(U, \phi)$ of $M$ such that $A \cap U = \phi^{-1}(\mathbb{R}^m)$ where $m$ is the dimension of $A$. For instance, in the category of smooth manifolds, this means that the embedding of $A$ must also be smooth.

== See also ==
- Local flatness
