= Local flatness =

Property of topological submanifolds

In topology, a branch of mathematics, local flatness is a smoothness condition that can be imposed on topological submanifolds. In the category of topological manifolds, locally flat submanifolds play a role similar to that of embedded submanifolds in the category of smooth manifolds. Violations of local flatness describe ridge networks and crumpled structures, with applications to materials processing and mechanical engineering.

== Definition ==
Suppose a d dimensional manifold N is embedded into an n dimensional manifold M (where d < n). If $x \in N,$ we say N is locally flat at x if there is a neighborhood $U \subset M$ of x such that the topological pair $(U, U\cap N)$ is homeomorphic to the pair $(\mathbb{R}^n,\mathbb{R}^d)$, with the standard inclusion of $\mathbb{R}^d\to\mathbb{R}^n.$ That is, there exists a homeomorphism $U\to \mathbb{R}^n$ such that the image of $U\cap N$ coincides with $\mathbb{R}^d$. In diagrammatic terms, the following square must commute:

alt=Commutative diagram: U&cap;N has a monomorphism to U, both of which have isomorphisms to $\mathbb{R}^d$ and $\mathbb{R}^n$ (respectively), and $\mathbb{R}^d$ has a monomorphism to $\mathbb{R}^n.$

We call N locally flat in M if N is locally flat at every point. Similarly, a map $\chi\colon N\to M$ is called locally flat, even if it is not an embedding, if every x in N has a neighborhood U whose image $\chi(U)$ is locally flat in M.

=== In manifolds with boundary ===
The above definition assumes that, if M has a boundary, x is not a boundary point of M. If x is a point on the boundary of M then the definition is modified as follows. We say that N is locally flat at a boundary point x of M if there is a neighborhood $U\subset M$ of x such that the topological pair $(U, U\cap N)$ is homeomorphic to the pair $(\mathbb{R}^n_+,\mathbb{R}^d)$, where $\mathbb{R}^n_+$ is a standard half-space and $\mathbb{R}^d$ is included as a standard subspace of its boundary.

== Consequences ==
Local flatness of an embedding implies strong properties not shared by all embeddings. Brown (1962) proved that if d = n − 1, then N is collared; that is, it has a neighborhood which is homeomorphic to N × [0,1] with N itself corresponding to N × 1/2 (if N is in the interior of M) or N × 0 (if N is in the boundary of M).

== Non-example ==
Let $K$ be a non-trivial knot in $S^3$; that is, a connected, locally flat one-dimensional submanifold of $S^3$ such that the pair $(S^3, K)$ is not homeomorphic to $(S^3, S^1)$. Then the cone on $K$ from the center $\underline{0}$ of $D^4$ is a submanifold of $D^4$, but it is not locally flat at $\underline{0}$.

== See also ==
- Euclidean space
- Neat submanifold
