= Side-approximation theorem =

- Field: Geometric topology
- Statement: Every 2-sphere in ℝ³ can be approximated by polyhedral 2-spheres.

In geometric topology, the side-approximation theorem was proved by Bing (1963). It implies that a 2-sphere in R^{3} can be approximated by polyhedral 2-spheres.
