= Double (manifold) =

In the subject of manifold theory in mathematics, if $M$ is a topological manifold with boundary, its double is obtained by gluing two copies of $M$ together along their common boundary. Precisely, the double is $M \times \{0,1\} / \sim$ where $(x,0) \sim (x,1)$ for all $x \in \partial M$. Equivalently, the double of $M$ is the boundary of $M \times [0,1]$. This gives doubles a special role in cobordism.

If $M$ has a smooth structure, then its double can be endowed with a smooth structure thanks to a collar neighbourhood.

Although the concept makes sense for any manifold, and even for some non-manifold sets such as the Alexander horned sphere, the notion of double tends to be used primarily in the context that $\partial M$ is non-empty and $M$ is compact.

== Examples ==
The n-sphere is the double of the n-ball. In this context, the two balls would be the upper and lower hemi-sphere respectively. More generally, if $M$ is closed, the double of $M \times D^k$ is $M \times S^k$. Even more generally, the double of a disc bundle over a manifold is a sphere bundle over the same manifold. More concretely, the double of the Möbius strip is the Klein bottle.

If $M$ is a closed, oriented manifold and if $M'$ is obtained from $M$ by removing an open ball, then the connected sum $M \mathrel{\#} -M$ is the double of $M'$.

The double of a Mazur manifold is a homotopy 4-sphere.
