= Wild arc =

Geometric topology embedding

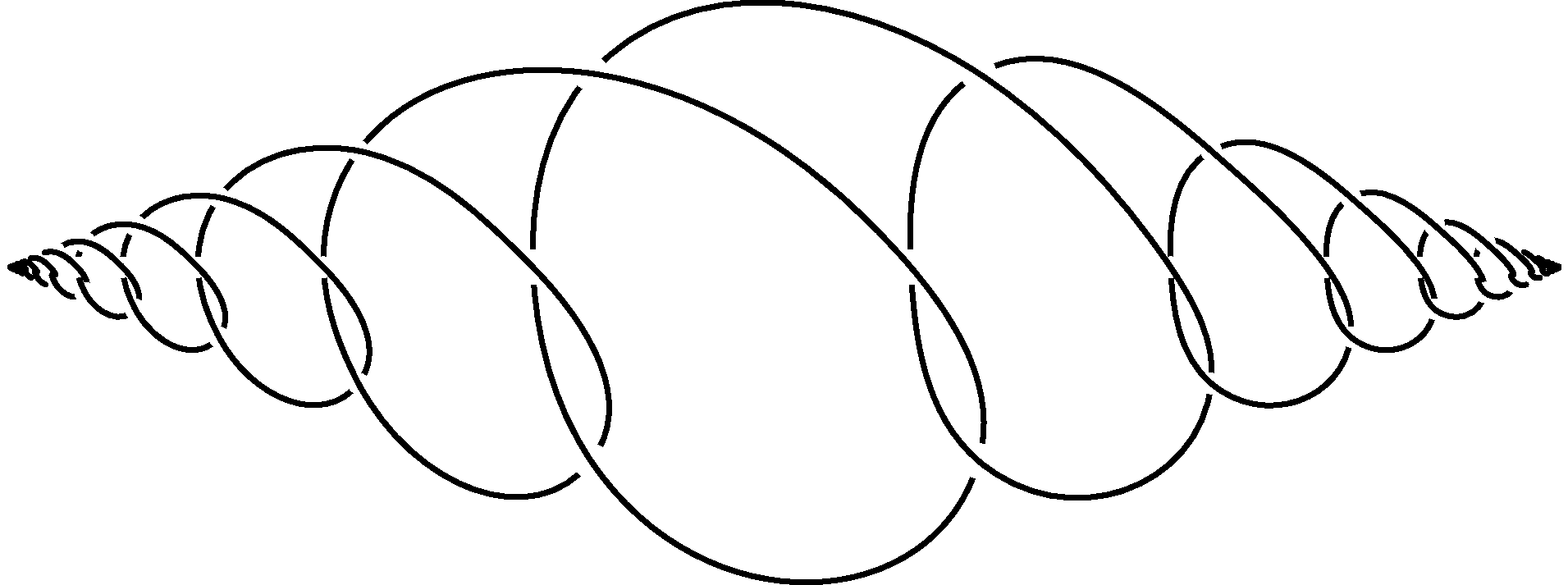
Fox-Artin arc Example 1.1

In geometric topology, a wild arc is an embedding of the unit interval into 3-dimensional space not equivalent to the usual one in the sense that there does not exist an ambient isotopy taking the arc to a straight line segment.

Antoine (1920) found the first example of a wild arc. Fox & Artin (1948) found another example, called the Fox-Artin arc, whose complement is not simply connected.

== Fox-Artin arcs ==
Two very similar wild arcs appear in the Fox & Artin (1948) article. Example 1.1 (page 981) is most generally referred to as the Fox-Artin wild arc. The crossings have the regular sequence over/over/under/over/under/under when following the curve from left to right.

The left end-point 0 of the closed unit interval $[0,1]$ is mapped by the arc to the left limit point of the curve, and 1 is mapped to the right limit point. The range of the arc lies in the Euclidean space $\mathbb{R}^3$ or the 3-sphere $S^3$.

=== Fox-Artin arc variant ===
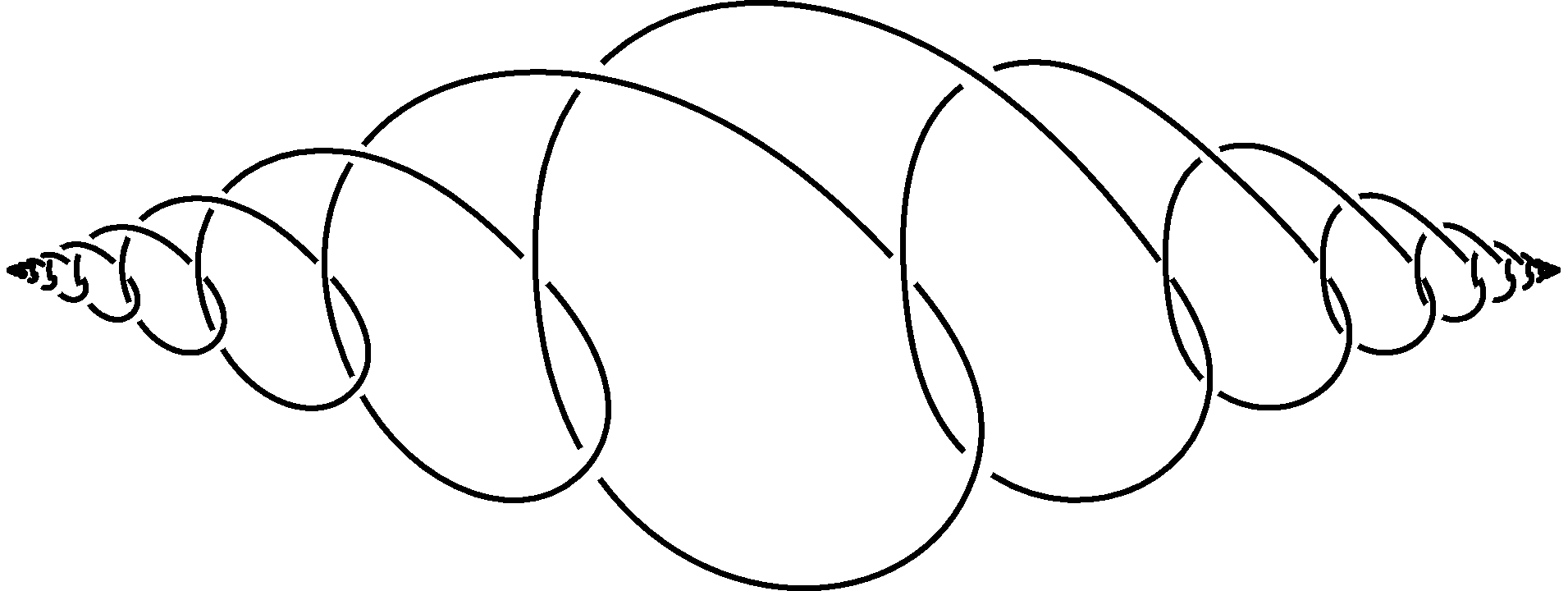
Fox-Artin arc Example 1.1*

Example 1.1* has the crossing sequence over/under/over/under/over/under. According to Fox & Artin (1948), page 982: "This is just the chain stitch of knitting extended indefinitely in both directions."

This arc cannot be continuously deformed to produce Example 1.1 in $\mathbb{R}^3$ or $S^3$, despite its similar appearance.

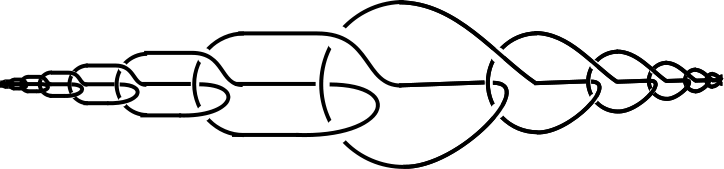
The Fox–Artin wild arc (Example 1.1*) lying in $\mathbb{R}^3$ drawn as a knot diagram. Note that each "tail" of the arc is converging to a point.

Also shown here is an alternative style of diagram for the arc in Example 1.1*.

== See also ==
- Wild knot
- Alexander horned sphere
