= Alexander's trick =

Two homeomorphisms of the n-ball which agree on the boundary sphere are isotopic

Alexander's trick, also known as the Alexander trick, is a basic result in geometric topology, named after J. W. Alexander.

== Statement ==
Two homeomorphisms of the n-dimensional ball $D^n$ which agree on the boundary sphere $S^{n-1}$ are isotopic.

More generally, two homeomorphisms of $D^n$ that are isotopic on the boundary are isotopic.

== Proof ==
Base case: every homeomorphism which fixes the boundary is isotopic to the identity relative to the boundary.

If $f\colon D^n \to D^n$ satisfies $f(x) = x \text{ for all } x \in S^{n-1}$, then an isotopy connecting f to the identity is given by

$$J(x,t) = \begin{cases} tf(x/t), & \text{if } 0 \leq \|x\| < t, \\ x, & \text{if } t \leq \|x\| \leq 1. \end{cases}$$

Visually, the homeomorphism is 'straightened out' from the boundary, 'squeezing' $f$ down to the origin. William Thurston calls this "combing all the tangles to one point". In the original 2-page paper, J. W. Alexander explains that for each $t>0$ the transformation $J_t$ replicates $f$ at a different scale, on the disk of radius $t$, thus as $t\rightarrow 0$ it is reasonable to expect that $J_t$ merges to the identity.

The subtlety is that at $t=0$, $f$ "disappears": the germ at the origin "jumps" from an infinitely stretched version of $f$ to the identity. Each of the steps in the homotopy could be smoothed (smooth the transition), but the homotopy (the overall map) has a singularity at $(x,t)=(0,0)$. This underlines that the Alexander trick is a PL construction, but not smooth.

General case: isotopic on boundary implies isotopic

If $f,g\colon D^n \to D^n$ are two homeomorphisms that agree on $S^{n-1}$, then $g^{-1}f$ is the identity on $S^{n-1}$, so we have an isotopy $J$ from the identity to $g^{-1}f$. The map $gJ$ is then an isotopy from $g$ to $f$.

== Radial extension ==
Some authors use the term Alexander trick for the statement that every homeomorphism of $S^{n-1}$ can be extended to a homeomorphism of the entire ball $D^n$.

However, this is much easier to prove than the result discussed above: it is called radial extension (or coning) and is also true piecewise-linearly, but not smoothly.

Concretely, let $f\colon S^{n-1} \to S^{n-1}$ be a homeomorphism, then

$F\colon D^n \to D^n \text{ with } F(rx) = rf(x) \text{ for all } r \in [0,1] \text{ and } x \in S^{n-1}$ defines a homeomorphism of the ball.

=== Exotic spheres ===
The failure of smooth radial extension and the success of PL radial extension yield exotic spheres via twisted spheres.

== See also ==
- Clutching construction
