= Morton Brown =

American mathematician (1931–2024)

- Born: August 12, 1931 (age 95); The Bronx, New York, U.S.
- Died: August 3, 2024 (aged 92); Bellevue, Washington
- Title: Professor Emeritus of Mathematics
- Awards: Oswald Veblen Prize in Geometry (1966)

Academic background
- Education: University of Wisconsin–Madison
- Thesis: Continuous collections of higher dimensional hereditarily indecomposable continua (1958)
- Doctoral advisor: R. H. Bing

Academic work
- Discipline: Geometric topology
- Institutions: University of Michigan

Morton Brown (August 12, 1931 – August 3, 2024) was an American mathematician who specialized in geometric topology.

== Life and career ==
Brown was born in New York City on August 12, 1931. In 1958 Brown earned his Ph.D. from the University of Wisconsin-Madison under R. H. Bing. From 1960 to 1962 he was at the Institute for Advanced Study. Afterwards he became a professor at the University of Michigan at Ann Arbor.

With Barry Mazur in 1965 he won the Oswald Veblen prize for their independent and nearly simultaneous proofs of the generalized Schoenflies hypothesis in geometric topology. Brown's short proof was elementary and fully general. Mazur's proof was also elementary, but it used a special assumption which was removed via later work of Morse.

In the late 1980s, Brown implemented a large reform to the calculus classes taught at the University of Michigan. His changes later became a model for a national calculus reform movement.

In 2012 he became an inaugural fellow of the American Mathematical Society.
