= Uniformizable space =

Topological space whose topology is generated by a uniform structure

In mathematics, a topological space X is uniformizable if there exists a uniform structure on X that induces the topology of X. Equivalently, X is uniformizable if and only if it is homeomorphic to a uniform space (equipped with the topology induced by the uniform structure).

Any (pseudo)metrizable space is uniformizable since the (pseudo)metric uniformity induces the (pseudo)metric topology. The converse fails: There are uniformizable spaces that are not (pseudo)metrizable. However, the topology of a uniformizable space can always be induced by a family of pseudometrics; indeed, this is because any uniformity on a set X can be defined by a family of pseudometrics.

Showing that a space is uniformizable is much simpler than showing it is metrizable. In fact, uniformizability is equivalent to a common separation axiom:

A topological space is uniformizable if and only if it is completely regular.

== Induced uniformity ==
One way to construct a uniform structure on a topological space X is to take the initial uniformity on X induced by C(X), the family of real-valued continuous functions on X. This is the coarsest uniformity on X for which all such functions are uniformly continuous. A subbase for this uniformity is given by the set of all entourages

$$D_{f,\varepsilon} = \{(x,y)\in X\times X : |f(x) - f(y)| < \varepsilon\}$$

where f ∈ C(X) and ε > 0.

The uniform topology generated by the above uniformity is the initial topology induced by the family C(X). In general, this topology will be coarser than the given topology on X. The two topologies will coincide if and only if X is completely regular.

== Fine uniformity ==
Given a uniformizable space X there is a finest uniformity on X compatible with the topology of X called the fine uniformity or universal uniformity. A uniform space is said to be fine if it has the fine uniformity generated by its uniform topology.

The fine uniformity is characterized by the universal property: any continuous function f from a fine space X to a uniform space Y is uniformly continuous. This implies that the functor F : CReg → Uni that assigns to any completely regular space X the fine uniformity on X is left adjoint to the forgetful functor sending a uniform space to its underlying completely regular space.

Explicitly, the fine uniformity on a completely regular space X is generated by all open neighborhoods D of the diagonal in X × X (with the product topology) such that there exists a sequence D_{1}, D_{2}, … of open neighborhoods of the diagonal with D = D_{1} and $D_n\circ D_n\subseteq D_{n-1}$.

The uniformity on a completely regular space X induced by C(X) (see the previous section) is not always the fine uniformity.
