= Bing metrization theorem =

Characterizes when a topological space is metrizable

In topology, the Bing metrization theorem, named after R. H. Bing, characterizes when a topological space is metrizable.

== Formal statement ==
The theorem states that a topological space $X$ is metrizable if and only if it is regular and T_{0} and has a σ-discrete basis. A family of sets is called σ-discrete when it is a union of countably many discrete collections, where a family $\mathcal{F}$ of subsets of a space $X$ is called discrete, when every point of $X$ has a neighborhood that intersects at most one member of $\mathcal{F}.$

== History ==
The theorem was proven by Bing in 1951 and was an independent discovery with the Nagata–Smirnov metrization theorem that was proved independently by both Nagata (1950) and Smirnov (1951). Both theorems are often merged in the Bing-Nagata-Smirnov metrization theorem. It is a common tool to prove other metrization theorems, e.g. the Moore metrization theorem – a collectionwise normal, Moore space is metrizable – is a direct consequence.

== Comparison with other metrization theorems ==
Unlike the Urysohn's metrization theorem which provides a sufficient condition for metrization, this theorem provides both a necessary and sufficient condition for a space to be metrizable. Another theorem that provides both a necessary and sufficient condition for a space to be metrizable is Nagata–Smirnov metrization theorem.

== See also ==
- Metrizable topological vector space – A topological vector space whose topology can be defined by a metric
- Nagata–Smirnov metrization theorem – Characterizes when a topological space is metrizable
