= Bing shrinking =

In geometric topology, a branch of mathematics, the Bing shrinking criterion, introduced by Bing (1952), is a method for showing that a quotient of a space is homeomorphic to the space.
