= Dunce hat (topology) =

Compact topological space

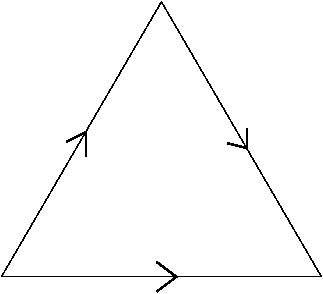
To get a dunce hat, take a solid triangle and successively glue together all three sides with the indicated orientation.

In topology, the dunce hat is a compact topological space formed by taking a solid triangle and gluing all three sides together, with the orientation of one side reversed. Simply gluing two sides oriented in the opposite direction would yield a cone much like the dunce cap, but the gluing of the third side results in identifying the base of the cap with a line joining the base to the point.

Dunce hat Folding. The blue hole is only for better view: it may be filled by a spherical cap. The (green) triangle border folds on a circle.

== Name ==
The name is due to E. C. Zeeman, who observed that any contractible 2-complex (such as the dunce hat) after taking the Cartesian product with the closed unit interval seemed to be collapsible. This observation became known as the Zeeman conjecture and was shown by Zeeman to imply the Poincaré conjecture.

== Properties ==
The dunce hat is contractible, but not collapsible. Contractibility can be easily seen by noting that the dunce hat embeds in the 3-ball and the 3-ball deformation retracts onto the dunce hat. Alternatively, note that the dunce hat is the CW-complex obtained by gluing the boundary of a 2-cell onto the circle. The gluing map is homotopic to the identity map on the circle and so the complex is homotopy equivalent to the disc. By contrast, it is not collapsible because it does not have a free face.

== See also ==
- House with two rooms
- List of topologies
