= Nagata–Smirnov metrization theorem =

Characterizes when a topological space is metrizable

In topology, the Nagata–Smirnov metrization theorem characterizes when a topological space is metrizable. The theorem states that a topological space $X$ is metrizable if and only if it is regular and has a countably locally finite (that is, 𝜎-locally finite) basis.

A topological space $X$ is called a regular space if every non-empty closed subset $C$ of $X$ and a point $p$ not contained in $C$ admit non-overlapping open neighborhoods. A collection in a space $X$ is countably locally finite (or 𝜎-locally finite) if it is the union of a countable family of locally finite collections of subsets of $X.$

Unlike Urysohn's metrization theorem, which provides only a sufficient condition for metrizability, this theorem provides both a necessary and sufficient condition for a topological space to be metrizable. The theorem is named after Junichi Nagata and Yuriĭ Mikhaĭlovich Smirnov, whose (independent) proofs were published in 1950 and 1951, respectively.

== See also ==
- Bing metrization theorem – Characterizes when a topological space is metrizable
- Kolmogorov's normability criterion – Characterization of normable spaces
- Uniformizable space – Topological space whose topology is generated by a uniform structure
