= Bing's recognition theorem =

On when a 3-manifold is homeomorphic to the 3-sphere

In topology, a branch of mathematics, Bing's recognition theorem, named for R. H. Bing, asserts that a necessary and sufficient condition for a 3-manifold M to be homeomorphic to the 3-sphere is that every Jordan curve in M be contained within a topological ball. It is a weak version of the Poincaré conjecture.
