= Yuri Mikhailovich Smirnov =

Yuri Mikhailovich Smirnov (Юрий Михайлович Смирнов, September 19, 1921, Kaluga – September 3, 2007, Moscow) was a Soviet and Russian mathematician, specializing in topology, and most notably remembered for helping in the creation of the Tsar Bomba.

== Biography ==
Yuri M. Smirnov was born in a family of clerical employees. His mother was imprisoned in 1937 for anti-Soviet activity and, as later revealed, was executed by gun shot. While studying at school, Yuri M. Smirnov was interested in mathematics and astronomy and after completing undergraduate study in 1939 entered the astronomy department of the Faculty of Mechanics and Mathematics of Moscow State University. However, soon under the influence of A. N. Kolmogorov, he transferred to the mathematical department of the same Faculty.

After his second year of undergraduate study, Smirnov went in autumn 1941 to the front and served as a radio operator in the Northern Fleet until the end of WW II. After demobilization in 1945, he continued his studies at the Faculty of Mechanics and Mathematics of Moscow State University and began to participate in the seminars of the famous topologist P. S. Alexandrov. In 1948 Smirnov graduated from the Faculty of Mechanics and Mathematics and entered the graduate school of the same faculty, at the same time starting to work as a junior researcher at the Steklov Institute of Mathematics. In 1951 he defended his Ph.D. (Russian Candidate of Sciences) thesis О топологических пространствах, компактных в данном отрезке мощностей (On topological spaces, compact in a given interval of cardinalities), which was supervised by P. S. Alexandrov. In 1957 Smirnov received his Russian Doctor of Sciences degree with thesis Исследование по общей и равномерной топологии методом покрытий (Investigation of general and uniform topology by the covering method).

From 1945 until the end of his life he worked at the Department of Higher Geometry and Topology of the Faculty of Mechanics and Mathematics of Moscow State University, from 1953 as an associate professor, and from 1958 as a full professor. He taught courses on analytical geometry, linear algebra and topology, linear algebra and geometry, differential geometry and topology, and the theories of retracts, shapes, and equivariant compactifications.

Smirnov published over a hundred scientific papers, most of which are related to general topology. He is the author of fundamental results on the problem of metrization of topological spaces and in equivariant topology, as well as in dimension theory and in the theories of shapes, retracts, and proximity spaces. His name is associated with the famous Nagata-Smirnov metrization theorem (proved independently by the Japanese mathematician Jun-iti Nagata). The theorem gives necessary and sufficient conditions for the existence of a metric generating the original topology.

Smirnov gave lectures not only in Russia, but also in Germany, Poland, Bulgaria, Georgia, Armenia, Uzbekistan, and Tajikistan. He supervised 12 Russian Doctor of Sciences (habilitation) degrees and more than 35 Candidate of Sciences degrees (PhDs).

He was awarded the Order of the Patriotic War for his WW II service. In 1962 he was an Invited Speaker with talk Некоторые вопросы равномерной топологии (Some questions of uniform topology) at the International Congress of Mathematicians in Stockholm. He was awarded honorary titles: Honored Professor of Moscow State University (1996), Honored Scientist of the USSR (1981), and Honored Scientist of the Russian Federation (2002). In 1995 he received the Sierpiński Medal jointly from the Polish Academy of Sciences and the University of Warsaw.
