= House with two rooms =

Topological space

Bing's house with two rooms, with its front wall removed. Small panels connect each vertical tunnel to the nearby side wall.

In topology, the house with two rooms or Bing's house is a particular contractible, 2-dimensional simplicial complex that is not collapsible. The name was given by R. H. Bing.

The house is made of 2-dimensional panels, and has two rooms. The upper room may be entered from the bottom face, while the lower room may be entered from the upper face. There are two small panels attached to the tunnels between the rooms, which make this simplicial complex contractible.

== See also ==
- Dogbone space, another topological example constructed by Bing
- Dunce hat (topology), another space that is contractible but not collapsible
- List of topologies
