= Metrizable space =

Topological space that is homeomorphic to a metric space

In topology and related areas of mathematics, a metrizable space is a topological space that is homeomorphic to a metric space. That is, a topological space $(X, \tau)$ is said to be metrizable if there is a metric $d : X \times X \to [0, \infty)$ such that the topology induced by $d$ is $\tau.$ Metrization theorems are theorems that give sufficient conditions for a topological space to be metrizable.

== Properties ==
Metrizable spaces inherit all topological properties from metric spaces. For example, they are Hausdorff paracompact spaces (and hence normal and Tychonoff) and first-countable. However, some properties of the metric, such as completeness, cannot be said to be inherited. This is also true of other structures linked to the metric. A metrizable uniform space, for example, may have a different set of contraction maps than a metric space to which it is homeomorphic.

== Metrization theorems ==
One of the first widely recognized metrization theorems was Urysohn's metrization theorem. This states that every Hausdorff second-countable regular space is metrizable. So, for example, every second-countable manifold is metrizable. (Historical note: The form of the theorem shown here was in fact proved by Tikhonov in 1926. What Urysohn had shown, in a paper published posthumously in 1925, was that every second-countable normal Hausdorff space is metrizable.) The converse does not hold: there exist metric spaces that are not second countable, for example, an uncountable set endowed with the discrete metric. The Nagata–Smirnov metrization theorem, described below, provides a more specific theorem where the converse does hold.

Several other metrization theorems follow as simple corollaries to Urysohn's theorem. For example, a compact Hausdorff space is metrizable if and only if it is second-countable.

Urysohn's Theorem can be restated as: A topological space is separable and metrizable if and only if it is regular, Hausdorff and second-countable. The Nagata–Smirnov metrization theorem extends this to the non-separable case. It states that a topological space is metrizable if and only if it is regular, Hausdorff and has a σ-locally finite base. A σ-locally finite base is a base which is a union of countably many locally finite collections of open sets. For a closely related theorem see the Bing metrization theorem.

Separable metrizable spaces can also be characterized as those spaces which are homeomorphic to a subspace of the Hilbert cube $\lbrack 0, 1 \rbrack ^\N,$ that is, the countably infinite product of the unit interval (with its natural subspace topology from the reals) with itself, endowed with the product topology.

A space is said to be locally metrizable if every point has a metrizable neighbourhood. Smirnov proved that a locally metrizable space is metrizable if and only if it is Hausdorff and paracompact. In particular, a manifold is metrizable if and only if it is paracompact.

== Examples ==
The group of unitary operators $\mathbb{U}(\mathcal{H})$ on a separable Hilbert space $\mathcal{H}$ endowed with the strong operator topology is metrizable (see Proposition II.1 in).

Non-normal spaces cannot be metrizable; important examples include

- the Zariski topology on an algebraic variety or on the spectrum of a ring, used in algebraic geometry,
- the topological vector space of all functions from the real line $\R$ to itself, with the topology of pointwise convergence.

The real line with the lower limit topology is not metrizable. The usual distance function is not a metric on this space because the topology it determines is the usual topology, not the lower limit topology. This space is Hausdorff, paracompact and first countable.

=== Locally metrizable but not metrizable ===
The Line with two origins, also called the bug-eyed line is a non-Hausdorff manifold (and thus cannot be metrizable). Like all manifolds, it is locally homeomorphic to Euclidean space and thus locally metrizable (but not metrizable) and locally Hausdorff (but not Hausdorff). It is also a T_{1} locally regular space but not a semiregular space.

The long line is locally metrizable but not metrizable; in a sense, it is "too long".

== See also ==
- Apollonian metric – Romanian mathematician and poet (1895 - 1961)
- Bing metrization theorem – Characterizes when a topological space is metrizable
- Metrizable topological vector space – Topological vector space whose topology can be defined by a metric
- Moore space (topology)
- Nagata–Smirnov metrization theorem – Characterizes when a topological space is metrizable
- Uniformizability – Topological space whose topology is generated by a uniform structure, the property of a topological space of being homeomorphic to a uniform space, or equivalently the topology being defined by a family of pseudometrics
