= Contractible space =

Can be continuously shrunk to a point

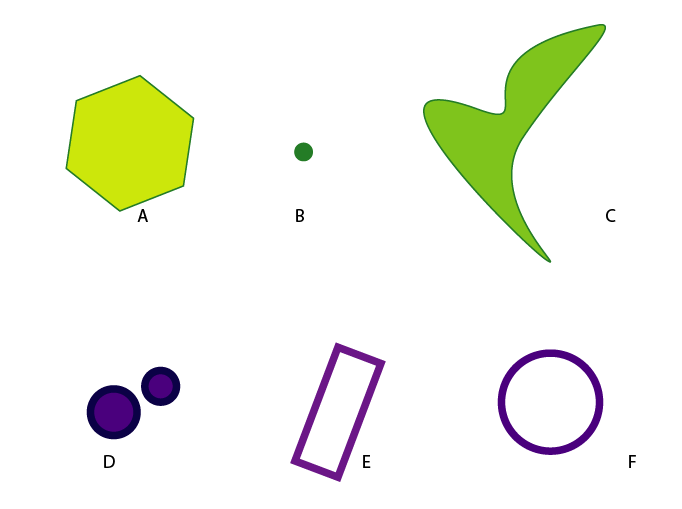
Illustration of some contractible and non-contractible spaces. Spaces A, B, and C are contractible; spaces D, E, and F are not.

In mathematics, a topological space X is contractible if the identity map on X is null-homotopic, i.e. if it is homotopic to some constant map. Intuitively, a contractible space is one that can be continuously shrunk to a point within that space.

== Properties ==
A contractible space is precisely one with the homotopy type of a point. It follows that all the homotopy groups of a contractible space are trivial. Therefore any space with a nontrivial homotopy group cannot be contractible. Similarly, since singular homology is a homotopy invariant, the reduced homology groups of a contractible space are all trivial.

For a nonempty topological space X the following are all equivalent:

- X is contractible (i.e. the identity map is null-homotopic).
- X is homotopy equivalent to a one-point space.
- X deformation retracts onto a point. (However, there exist contractible spaces which do not strongly deformation retract to a point.)
- For any path-connected space Y, any two maps f,g: X → Y are homotopic.
- For any nonempty space Y, any map f: Y → X is null-homotopic.

The cone on a space X is always contractible. Therefore any space can be embedded in a contractible one (which also illustrates that subspaces of contractible spaces need not be contractible).

Furthermore, X is contractible if and only if there exists a retraction from the cone of X to X.

Every contractible space is path connected and simply connected. Moreover, since all the higher homotopy groups vanish, every contractible space is n-connected for all n ≥ 0.

== Locally contractible spaces ==
A topological space X is locally contractible at a point x if for every neighborhood U of x there is a neighborhood V of x contained in U such that the inclusion of V is nulhomotopic in U. A space is locally contractible if it is locally contractible at every point. This definition is occasionally referred to as the "geometric topologist's locally contractible," though is the most common usage of the term. In Hatcher's standard Algebraic Topology text, this definition is referred to as "weakly locally contractible," though that term has other uses.

If every point has a local base of contractible neighborhoods, then we say that X is strongly locally contractible. Contractible spaces are not necessarily locally contractible nor vice versa. For example, the comb space is contractible but not locally contractible (if it were, it would be locally connected which it is not). Locally contractible spaces are locally n-connected for all n ≥ 0. In particular, they are locally simply connected, locally path connected, and locally connected. The circle is (strongly) locally contractible but not contractible.

Strong local contractibility is a strictly stronger property than local contractibility; the counterexamples are sophisticated, the first being given by Borsuk and Mazurkiewicz in their paper Sur les rétractes absolus indécomposables, C.R.. Acad. Sci. Paris 199 (1934), 110-112).

There is some disagreement about which definition is the "standard" definition of local contractibility; the first definition is more commonly used in geometric topology, especially historically, whereas the second definition fits better with the typical usage of the term "local" with respect to topological properties. Care should always be taken regarding the definitions when interpreting results about these properties.

== Examples and counterexamples ==
- Any Euclidean space is contractible, as is any star domain on a Euclidean space.
- The Whitehead manifold is contractible.
- Spheres of any finite dimension are not contractible, although they are simply connected in dimension at least 2.
- The unit sphere in an infinite-dimensional Hilbert space is contractible.
- The house with two rooms is a standard example of a space which is contractible, but not intuitively so.
- The Dunce hat is contractible, but not collapsible.
- The cone on a Hawaiian earring is contractible (since it is a cone), but not locally contractible or even locally simply connected.
- All manifolds and CW complexes are locally contractible, but in general not contractible.
- The Warsaw circle is obtained by "closing up" the topologist's sine curve by an arc connecting (0,−1) and (1,sin(1)). It is a one-dimensional continuum whose homotopy groups are all trivial, but it is not contractible.

== See also ==
- Fake 4-ball – Mathematical topological manifold
