= Jun-iti Nagata =

Japanese mathematician

Dr Jun-iti Nagata
- 長田潤一
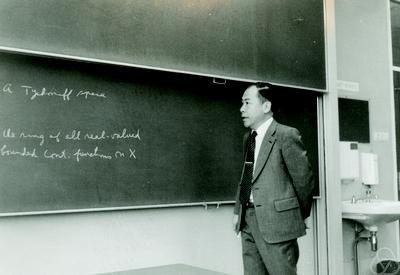
- Jun-iti Nagata in 1977
- Born: 1925
- Died: November 6, 2007 (aged 81–82)
- Occupation: Mathematician
- Known for: Nagata–Smirnov metrization theorem
- Title: Professor emeritus

Academic background
- Education: Osaka University
- Doctoral advisor: Kiiti Morita

Academic work
- Discipline: Topology mathematics
- Institutions: Osaka Kyoiku University, Osaka Electro-Communication University
- Notable works: Modern Dimension Theory, Modern General Topology

Jun-iti Nagata (長田 潤一, Nagata Jun'ichi; 1925 - 6 November 2007) was a Japanese mathematician specializing in topology.

In 1956, Jun-iti Nagata earned his PhD from Osaka University under the direction of Kiiti Morita. He was the author of two standard graduate texts in topology: Modern Dimension Theory and Modern General Topology. His name is attached to the Nagata–Smirnov metrization theorem, which was proved independently by Nagata in 1950 and by Smirnov in 1951, as well as the Assouad–Nagata dimension of a metric space, which he introduced in a 1958 article.

Nagata became a professor emeritus at both Osaka Kyoiku University, where he taught for 10 years, and Osaka Electro-Communication University, where he taught for 5 years.

== Works ==
- Jun-iti Nagata: Modern Dimension Theory, Interscience Publishers (1965)
- Jun-iti Nagata: Modern General Topology, John Wiley (1968), ISBN 0-444-87655-3
- Kiiti Morita – Jun-iti Nagata: Topics in General Topology, North-Holland (1989) ISBN 0-444-70455-8
- K.P. Hart, Jun-iti Nagata, and J.E. Vaughan: Encyclopedia of General Topology, Elsevier Science (August 16, 2004), ISBN 0-444-50355-2
