= Arthur Moritz Schoenflies =

German mathematician

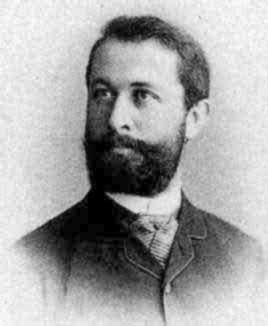
- Born: 17 April 1853; Landsberg an der Warthe, Brandenburg, Prussia
- Died: 27 May 1928 (aged 75); Frankfurt am Main, Hesse-Nassau, Germany
- Resting place: Frankfurt Main Cemetery
- Education: University of Berlin
- Known for: Jordan–Schoenflies theorem Schoenflies notation Schoenflies displacement
- Spouse: Emma Levin
- Children: 5
- Scientific career
- Fields: Group theory, crystallography, and topology
- Thesis: Synthetisch-geometrische Untersuchungen über Flächen zweiten Grades und eine aus ihnen abgeleitete Regelfläche (1877)
- Doctoral advisors: Ernst Kummer; Karl Weierstrass

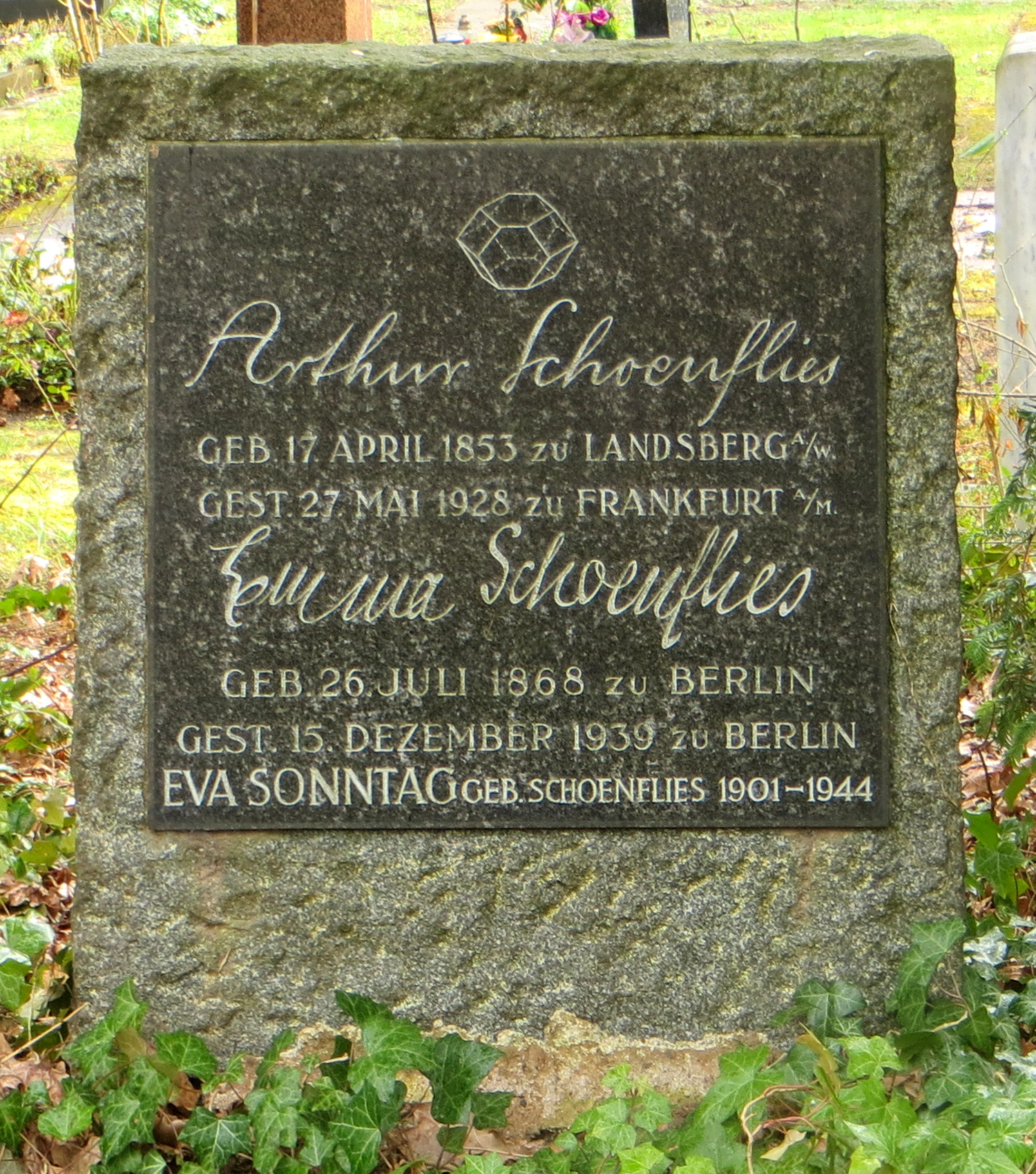
Schoenflies's grave at the Frankfurt Main Cemetery

Arthur Moritz Schoenflies (German: [ˈʃøːnfliːs]; 17 April 1853 – 27 May 1928), sometimes written as Schönflies, was a German mathematician, known for his contributions to the application of group theory to crystallography, and for work in topology.

Schoenflies was born in Landsberg an der Warthe (modern Gorzów, Poland). Arthur Schoenflies married Emma Levin (1868–1939) in 1896. He studied under Ernst Kummer and Karl Weierstrass, and was influenced by Felix Klein.

The Schoenflies problem is to prove that an $(n - 1)$-sphere in Euclidean n-space bounds a topological ball, however embedded. This question is much more subtle than it initially appears.

He studied at the University of Berlin from 1870 to 1875. He obtained a doctorate in 1877, and in 1878 he was a teacher at a school in Berlin. In 1880, he went to Colmar to teach.

Schoenflies was a frequent contributor to Klein's Encyclopedia of Mathematical Sciences: In 1898 he wrote on set theory, in 1902 on kinematics, and on projective geometry in 1910.

He was a great-uncle of Walter Benjamin.

== Selected works ==
- Geometrie der Bewegung in synthetischer Darstellung. Teubner, 1886; translated by Charles Speckel as La Géométrie du Mouvement. Exposé synthétique. Gauthier-Villars 1893
- Einführung in die mathematische Behandlung der Naturwissenschaft. 1st edition, Dr. E. Wolff, 1895; 2nd editions 1931 (with Walther Nernst)
- Entwicklung der Mengenlehre und ihrer Anwendungen. Teubner, 1913 (with Hans Hahn).
- Kristallsysteme und Kristallstruktur, Teubner 1891
- Theorie der Kristallstruktur. Ein Lehrbuch. Gebr. Borntraeger, 1923.
- Einführung in die Hauptgesetze der zeichnerischen Darstellungsmethoden, Teubner 1908, Project Gutenberg ebook
- Articles: Mengenlehre (1898), Projektive Geometrie (1909), Kinematik (1902), Kristallographie (with Theodor Liebisch, Otto Mügge), in Klein's encyclopedia.

== See also ==
- Fyodorov–Schoenflies–Bieberbach theorem
- Jordan–Schoenflies theorem
- Schoenflies notation
- Schoenflies displacement
- Heine–Borel theorem
- Geometrical crystallography before X-rays
