= Louis Antoine =

French mathematician (1888–1971)

Louis Antoine (23 November 1888 – 8 February 1971) was a French mathematician who discovered Antoine's necklace, which J. W. Alexander used to construct Antoine's horned sphere. He lost his eyesight in the first World War, at the age of 29.

== Early life ==
Louis Antoine was born in Mirecourt. He studied at the lycee in Nancy. His father was a director of a manufacturer of matchsticks. After this, he studied at the Collège de Compiègne. He was awarded the bacculareat in Latin and science in 1905 and the bacculareat in mathematics in 1906. He then attended École Normale Supérieure. Once he graduated, he became a mathematics teacher the Lycée de Dijon in Saint-Cyr.

He married his wife, Marguerite Rouselle in 1918. After the declaration of World War I, Antoine served as a reserve lieutenant in the 72nd Infantry Regiment of Amiens, and later a commander on the machine gun of the 151st Infantry Regiment. In 1917, he lost his sight as a result of bullets hitting his eyes.

After the loss of his vision, Henri Lebesgue suggested that Antoine study two- and three-dimensional topology as it could be studied without the use of his sight.

== Work ==
In 1919, Antoine began his doctorate in mathematics at the University of Strasbourg. Antoine was assisted by his friends during his studies, who produced braille copies of mathematical papers. Antoine developed a system of braille mathematical notation, with the assistance of a student at École Normale Supérieure.

Antoine discovered Antoine's necklace in 1921. He submitted his thesis in 1921. In 1922, Antoine became an assistant lecturer at the Faculty of Sciences in Rennes. He subsequently became a professor of Pure Mathematics at Rennes in 1925.

== Later life and death ==
Antoine began to experience heart disease in 1957. He subsequently retired from his professorship. He was elected to the Académie des Sciences in 1961. He died in 1971 after fracturing his neck.
