= Wild knot =

Knot that can't be tied in a string of constant diameter

A wild knot

In the mathematical theory of knots, a knot is tame if it can be "thickened", that is, if there exists an extension to an embedding of the solid torus $S^1\times D^2$ into the 3-sphere. A knot is tame if and only if it can be represented as a finite closed polygonal chain. In knot theory and 3-manifold theory, often the adjective "tame" is omitted. Smooth knots, for example, are always tame.

Knots that are not tame are called wild and can have pathological behavior. Every closed curve containing a wild arc is a wild knot. It has been conjectured that every wild knot has infinitely many quadrisecants.

As well as their mathematical study, wild knots have also been studied for their potential for decorative purposes in Celtic-style ornamental knotwork.

== See also ==
- Wild arc
- Alexander horned sphere
- Eilenberg–Mazur swindle, a technique for analyzing connected sums using infinite sums of knots
