= James Waddell Alexander II =

American mathematician (1888–1971)

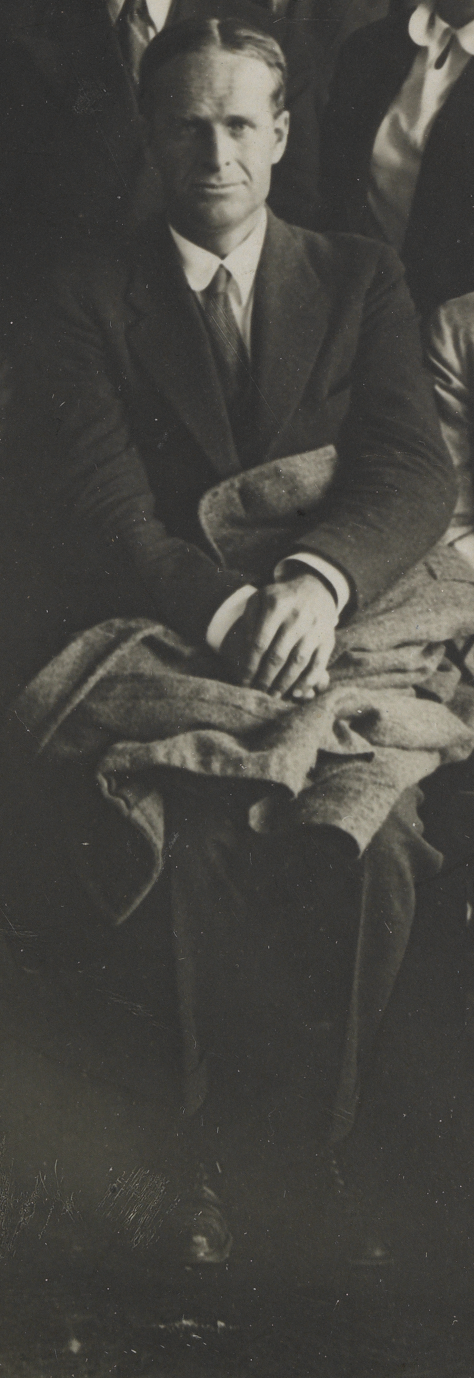
- At a topological conference in Moscow, 1935
- Born: September 19, 1888; Sea Bright, New Jersey
- Died: September 23, 1971 (aged 83); Princeton, New Jersey
- Education: Princeton University
- Known for: Algebraic topology
- Awards: Bôcher Memorial Prize (1928)
- Scientific career
- Fields: Topology
- Thesis: Functions Which Map the Interior of the Unit Circle Upon Simple Regions (1915)
- Doctoral advisor: Oswald Veblen

James Waddell Alexander II (September 19, 1888 – September 23, 1971) was a mathematician of the pre-World War II era. He was part of an influential school of topology at Princeton University, along with Oswald Veblen, Solomon Lefschetz, and others. He was a professor at Princeton (1920–1951) and one of the first members of the Institute for Advanced Study (1933–1951).

== Early life, family, and personal life ==
James was born on September 19, 1888, in Sea Bright, New Jersey. Alexander came from an old, distinguished Princeton family. He was the only child of the American portrait painter John White Alexander and Elizabeth Alexander. His maternal grandfather, James Waddell Alexander, was the president of the Equitable Life Assurance Society. Alexander's affluence and upbringing allowed him to interact with high society in America and elsewhere.

He married Natalia Levitzkaja on January 11, 1918, a Russian woman. Together, they had two children.

They would frequently spend time, until 1937, in the Chamonix area of France, where he would also climb mountains and hills. Alexander was also a noted mountaineer, having succeeded in many major ascents, e.g. in the Swiss Alps and Colorado Rockies. When in Princeton, he liked to climb the university buildings, and always left his office window on the top floor of Fine Hall open so that he could enter by climbing the building.

== Education ==
He graduated from Princeton University with a Bachelor of Science degree in 1910. He received his Masters of Arts degree in 1911 and his doctoral degree in 1915.

== Military career ==
During World War I, Alexander served with tech staff in the Ordnance Department of the United States Army overseas. He retired as a Captain.

== Academic career ==
He was a pioneer in algebraic topology, setting the foundations for Henri Poincaré's ideas on homology theory and furthering it by founding cohomology theory, which developed gradually in the decade after he gave a definition of cochain. For this, in 1928 he was awarded the Bôcher Memorial Prize. He also contributed to the beginnings of knot theory by inventing the Alexander invariant of a knot, which in modern terms is a graded module obtained from the homology of a "cyclic covering" of the knot complement. From this invariant, he defined the first of the polynomial knot invariants.

With Garland Briggs, he also gave a combinatorial description of knot invariance based on certain moves, now (against the history) called the Reidemeister moves; and also a means of computing homological invariants from the knot diagram.

Alexander was an elected member of both the American Philosophical Society and the American Academy of Arts and Sciences.

Towards the end of his life, Alexander became a recluse. He was known as a socialist and his prominence brought him to the attention of McCarthyists. The atmosphere of the McCarthy era pushed him into a greater seclusion. He was not seen in public after 1954, when he appeared to sign a letter supporting J. Robert Oppenheimer.

== Death and legacy ==
He died on September 23, 1971.

Alexander's Chimney in Rocky Mountain National Park is named after him.

== See also ==
- Alexander horned sphere
- Alexander polynomial
- Alexander–Spanier cohomology
- Alexander duality
- Alexander's trick
- Alexander's subbase lemma

== Sources ==
- James, I. M., Portrait of Alexander (1888–1971), Bull. Amer. Math. Soc. (N.S.) 38 (2001), no. 2, 123–129.
- Cohen, Leon W., James Waddell Alexander (1888–1971), Bull. Amer. Math. Soc. 79 (1973), no. 5, 900—903.
