= Crumpled cube =

In geometric topology, a branch of mathematics, a crumpled cube is any space in R^{3} homeomorphic to a 2-sphere together with its interior. Lininger showed in 1965 that the union of a crumpled cube and an open 3-ball glued along their boundaries is a 3-sphere.
