= Derived set (mathematics) =

Set of all limit points of a set

In mathematics, more specifically in point-set topology, the derived set of a subset $S$ of a topological space is the set of all limit points of $S.$ It is usually denoted by $S'.$

The concept was first introduced by Georg Cantor in 1872 and he developed set theory in large part to study derived sets on the real line.

== Definition ==
The derived set of a subset $S$ of a topological space $X,$ denoted by $S',$ is the set of all points $x \in X$ that are limit points of $S,$ that is, points $x$ such that every neighbourhood of $x$ contains a point of $S$ other than $x$ itself.

== Examples ==
If $\Reals$ is endowed with its usual Euclidean topology then the derived set of the half-open interval $[0, 1)$ is the closed interval $[0, 1].$

Consider $\Reals$ with the topology (open sets) consisting of the empty set and any subset of $\Reals$ that contains 1. The derived set of $A := \{1\}$ is $A' = \Reals \setminus \{1\}.$

== Properties ==
Let $X$ denote a topological space in what follows.

If $A$ and $B$ are subsets of $X,$ the derived set has the following properties:

- $\varnothing' = \varnothing$
- $a \in A'$ implies $a \in (A \setminus \{a\})'$
- $(A \cup B)' = A' \cup B'$
- $A \subseteq B$ implies $A' \subseteq B'$

A set $S\subseteq X$ is closed precisely when $S' \subseteq S,$ that is, when $S$ contains all its limit points. For any $S\subseteq X,$ the set $S \cup S'$ is closed and is the closure of $S$ (that is, the set $\overline{S}$).

=== Closedness of derived sets ===
The derived set of a set need not be closed in general. For example, if $X = \{a, b\}$ with the indiscrete topology, the set $S = \{a\}$ has derived set $S' = \{b\},$ which is not closed in $X.$ But the derived set of a closed set is always closed. (Note: Proof: Assuming $S$ is a closed subset of $X,$ which shows that $S' \subseteq S,$ take the derived set on both sides to get $S'' \subseteq S';$ that is, $S'$ is closed in $X.$)

For a point $x\in X,$ the derived set of the singleton $\{x\}$ is the set $\{x\}'=\overline{\{x\}}\setminus\{x\},$ consisting of the points in the closure of $\{x\}$ and different from $x.$ A space $X$ is called a T_{D} space if the derived set of every singleton in $X$ is closed; that is, if $\overline{\{x\}}\setminus\{x\}$ is closed for every $x\in X;$ in other words, if every point $x$ is isolated in $\overline{\{x\}}.$ A space $X$ has the property that $S'$ is closed for all sets $S\subseteq X$ if and only if it is a T_{D} space.

Every T_{D} space is a T_{0} space.

Every T_{1} space is a T_{D} space, since every singleton is closed, hence $\{x\}'=\overline{\{x\}}\setminus\{x\}=\varnothing,$ which is closed. Consequently, in a T_{1} space, the derived set of any set is closed.

The relation between these properties can be summarized as
$$T_1\implies T_D\implies T_0.$$

The implications are not reversible. For example, the Sierpiński space is T_{D} and not T_{1}. And the right order topology on $\R$ is T_{0} and not T_{D}.

=== More properties ===
Two subsets $S$ and $T$ are separated precisely when they are disjoint and each is disjoint from the other's derived set $S' \cap T = \varnothing = T' \cap S.$

A bijection between two topological spaces is a homeomorphism if and only if the derived set of the image (in the second space) of any subset of the first space is the image of the derived set of that subset.

In a T_{1} space, the derived set of any finite set is empty and furthermore,
$$(S - \{p\})' = S' = (S \cup \{p\})',$$
for any subset $S$ and any point $p$ of the space. In other words, the derived set is not changed by adding to or removing from the given set a finite number of points.

A set $S$ with $S \subseteq S'$ (that is, $S$ contains no isolated points) is called dense-in-itself. A set $S$ with $S = S'$ is called a perfect set. Equivalently, a perfect set is a closed dense-in-itself set, or, put another way, a closed set with no isolated points. Perfect sets are particularly important in applications of the Baire category theorem.

The Cantor–Bendixson theorem states that any Polish space can be written as the union of a countable set and a perfect set. Because any G_{δ} subset of a Polish space is again a Polish space, the theorem also shows that any G_{δ} subset of a Polish space is the union of a countable set and a set that is perfect with respect to the induced topology.

== Topology in terms of derived sets ==
Because homeomorphisms can be described entirely in terms of derived sets, derived sets have been used as the primitive notion in topology. A set of points $X$ can be equipped with an operator $S \mapsto S^*$ mapping subsets of $X$ to subsets of $X,$ such that for any set $S$ and any point $a$:

1. $\varnothing^* = \varnothing$
2. $S^{**} \subseteq S^*\cup S$
3. $a \in S^*$ implies $a \in (S \setminus \{a\})^*$
4. $(S \cup T)^* \subseteq S^* \cup T^*$
5. $S \subseteq T$ implies $S^* \subseteq T^*.$

Calling a set $S$ closed if $S^* \subseteq S$ will define a topology on the space in which $S \mapsto S^*$ is the derived set operator, that is, $S^* = S'.$

== Cantor–Bendixson rank ==
For ordinal numbers $\alpha,$ the $\alpha$-th Cantor–Bendixson derivative of a topological space X is defined by repeatedly applying the derived set operation using transfinite recursion as follows:

- $\displaystyle X^0 = X$
- $\displaystyle X^{\alpha+1} = \left(X^\alpha\right)'$
- $\displaystyle X^\lambda = \bigcap_{\alpha < \lambda} X^\alpha$ for limit ordinals $\lambda.$

The transfinite sequence of Cantor–Bendixson derivatives of $X$ is decreasing and must eventually be constant. The smallest ordinal $\alpha$ such that $X^{\alpha+1} = X^\alpha$ is called the Cantor–Bendixson rank of $X.$

This investigation into the derivation process was one of the motivations for introducing ordinal numbers by Georg Cantor.

== See also ==
- Adherent point – Point that belongs to the closure of some given subset of a topological space
- Condensation point – Type of accumulation point
- Isolated point – Point of a subset S around which there are no other points of S
- Limit point – Cluster point in a topological space

== Notes ==
Proofs
