= Paranormal space =

Separation axioms in topological spaces

Kolmogorov classification
- T_{0}: (Kolmogorov)
- T_{1}: (Fréchet)
- T_{2}: (Hausdorff)
- T_{2½}: (Urysohn)
- completely T_{2}: (completely Hausdorff)
- T_{3}: (regular Hausdorff)
- T_{3½}: (Tychonoff)
- T_{4}: (normal Hausdorff)
- T_{5}: (completely normal Hausdorff)
- T_{6}: (perfectly normal Hausdorff)

In mathematics, in the realm of topology, a paranormal space (Nyikos 1984) is a topological space in which every countable discrete collection of closed sets has a locally finite open expansion.

== See also ==
- Collectionwise normal space – Property of topological spaces stronger than normality
- Locally normal space
- Monotonically normal space – Property of topological spaces stronger than normality
- Normal space – Type of topological space – a topological space in which every two disjoint closed sets have disjoint open neighborhoods
- Paracompact space – Topological space in which every open cover has an open refinement that is locally finite – a topological space in which every open cover admits an open locally finite refinement
- Separation axiom – Axioms in topology defining notions of "separation"
