= Ivar Otto Bendixson =

Swedish mathematician (1861–1935)

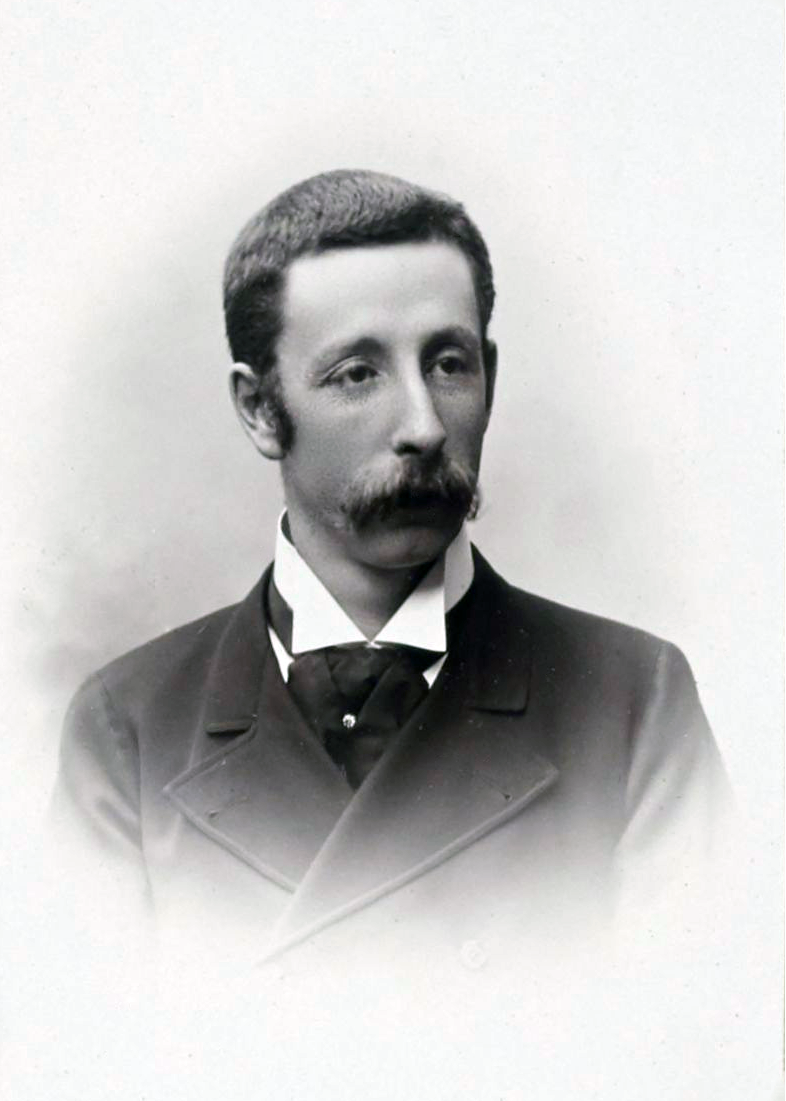
- Born: 1 August 1861; Stockholm, Sweden
- Died: 29 November 1935 (aged 74); Stockholm, Sweden
- Occupation: Mathematician
- Known for: Bendixson's inequality Bendixson–Dulac theorem Cantor–Bendixson rank Cantor–Bendixson theorem Poincaré–Bendixson theorem

Ivar Otto Bendixson (1 August 1861 – 29 November 1935) was a Swedish mathematician.

== Biography ==
Bendixson was born on 1 August 1861 at Villa Bergshyddan, Djurgården, Oscar Parish, Stockholm, Sweden, to a middle-class family. His father Vilhelm Emanuel Bendixson was a merchant, and his mother was Tony Amelia Warburg. On completing secondary education in Stockholm, he obtained his school certificate on 25 May 1878.

On 13 September 1878 he enrolled to the Royal Institute of Technology in Stockholm. In 1879 Bendixson went to Uppsala University and graduated with the equivalent of a master's degree on 27 January 1881. Graduating from Uppsala, he went on to study at the newly opened Stockholm University College after which he was awarded a doctorate by Uppsala University on 29 May 1890.

On 10 June 1890 Bendixson was appointed as a docent at Stockholm University College. He then worked as an assistant to the professor of mathematical analysis from 5 March 1891 until 31 May 1892. From 1892 until 1899 he taught at the Royal Institute of Technology and he also taught calculus and algebra at Stockholm University College. During this period he married Anna Helena Lind on 19 December 1887. Anna, who was about eighteen months older than Bendixson, was the daughter of the banker Johan Lind.

In 1899 Bendixson substituted for the Professor of Pure Mathematics at the Royal Institute of Technology and then he was promoted to professor there on 26 January 1900. On June 16, 1905, he assumed the position of professor of higher mathematical analysis at Stockholm University College, and he served as its rector from 1911 until 1927.

For his outstanding contributions, Bendixson received many honours including an honorary doctorate on 24 May 1907.

Bendixson became more involved in politics as his career progressed. He was well known for his mild left-wing views and he put his beliefs into practice being head of a committee to help poor students. He served on many other committees and he was an advisor to a committee that investigated a proportional representation voting system in Sweden in 1912–13. In this capacity he was able to make use of his mathematical skills in advising the committee.

== Scientific achievements ==
Bendixson started out very much as a pure mathematician but later in his career he turned to also consider problems from applied mathematics. His first research work was on set theory and the foundations of mathematics, following the ideas that Georg Cantor had introduced. He contributed important results in point-set topology. As a young student, Bendixson made his name by proving that every uncountable closed set of reals can be partitioned into a perfect set (the Cantor–Bendixson derivative of the original set) and a countable set. He also gave another important contribution when he gave an example of a perfect set that is totally disconnected.

Concerning solution of a polynomial equation by radicals, Bendixson returned to Niels Henrik Abel's original contribution and showed that Abel's methods could be extended to describe precisely which equations could be solved by radicals.

The analysis problem that intrigued Bendixson more than all others was the investigation of integral curves to first-order differential equations, in particular he was intrigued by the complicated behaviour of the integral curves in the neighbourhood of singular points. The Poincaré–Bendixson theorem, which says an integral curve that does not end in a singular point has a limit cycle, was first proved by Henri Poincaré, but a more rigorous proof with weaker hypotheses was given by Bendixson in 1901.

In 1902, he derived Bendixson's inequality, which puts bounds on the eigenvalues of real matrices.
