= Locally normal space =

Separation axioms in topological spaces

Kolmogorov classification
- T_{0}: Kolmogorov
- T_{1}: Fréchet
- T_{2}: Hausdorff
- T_{2½}: Urysohn
- completely T_{2}: completely Hausdorff
- T_{3}: regular Hausdorff
- T_{3½}: Tychonoff
- T_{4}: normal Hausdorff
- T_{5}: completely normal Hausdorff
- T_{6}: perfectly normal Hausdorff

In mathematics, particularly topology, a topological space X is locally normal if intuitively it looks locally like a normal space. More precisely, a locally normal space satisfies the property that each point of the space belongs to a neighbourhood of the space that is normal under the subspace topology.

== Formal definition ==
A topological space X is said to be locally normal if and only if each point, x, of X has a neighbourhood that is normal under the subspace topology.

Note that not every neighbourhood of x has to be normal, but at least one neighbourhood of x has to be normal (under the subspace topology).

Note however, that if a space were called locally normal if and only if each point of the space belonged to a subset of the space that was normal under the subspace topology, then every topological space would be locally normal. This is because, the singleton {x} is vacuously normal and contains x. Therefore, the definition is more restrictive.

== Examples and properties ==
- Every locally normal T1 space is locally regular and locally Hausdorff.
- A locally compact Hausdorff space is always locally normal.
- A normal space is always locally normal.
- A T1 space need not be locally normal as the set of all real numbers endowed with the cofinite topology shows.

== See also ==
- Collectionwise normal space – Property of topological spaces stronger than normality
- Homeomorphism – Mapping which preserves all topological properties of a given space
- Locally compact space – Type of topological space in mathematics
- Locally Hausdorff space – Space such that every point has a Hausdorff neighborhood
- Locally metrizable space – Topological space that is homeomorphic to a metric space
- Monotonically normal space – Property of topological spaces stronger than normality
- Normal space – Type of topological space
- Paranormal space
