= Dense-in-itself =

Topological subset with no isolated point

In general topology, a subset $A$ of a topological space is said to be dense-in-itself or crowded if $A$ has no isolated point of $A$. Equivalently, $A$ is dense-in-itself if every point of $A$ is a limit point of $A$. Thus $A$ is dense-in-itself if and only if $A\subseteq A'$, where $A'$ is the derived set of $A$.

A dense-in-itself closed set is called a perfect set. (In other words, a perfect set is a closed set without isolated point.)

The property of being dense-in-itself depends only on the subspace topology of $A$, namely, $A$ is a dense-in-itself subset of $X$ if and only if $A$ is a dense-in-itself subset of $A$. Some authors would say that $A$ is a perfect space in its subspace topology (note that the phrase perfect space is ambiguous).

The notion of dense set is distinct from dense-in-itself. This can sometimes be confusing, as "$X$ is dense in $X$" (always true) is not the same as "$X$ is dense-in-itself" (contains no isolated points).

== Examples ==
A simple example of a set that is dense-in-itself but not closed (and hence not a perfect set) is the set of irrational numbers (considered as a subset of the real numbers). This set is dense-in-itself because every neighborhood of an irrational number $x$ contains at least one other irrational number $y \neq x$. On the other hand, the set of irrationals is not closed because every rational number lies in its closure. Similarly, the set of rational numbers is also dense-in-itself but not closed in the space of real numbers.

The above examples, the irrationals and the rationals, are also dense sets in their topological space, namely $\mathbb{R}$. As an example that is dense-in-itself but not dense in its topological space, consider $\mathbb{Q} \cap [0,1]$. This set is not dense in $\mathbb{R}$ but is dense-in-itself.

== Properties ==
A singleton is never dense-in-itself.

The dense-in-itself subsets of any space are closed under arbitrary unions. In a dense-in-itself space, they include all open sets. In a dense-in-itself T_{1} space they include all dense sets. However, spaces that are not T_{1} may have dense subsets that are not dense-in-itself: for example in the dense-in-itself space $X=\{a,b\}$ with the indiscrete topology, the set $A=\{a\}$ is dense, but is not dense-in-itself.

The closure of any dense-in-itself set is a perfect set.

In general, the intersection of two dense-in-itself sets is not dense-in-itself. But the intersection of a dense-in-itself set and an open set is dense-in-itself.

== See also ==
- Nowhere dense set
- Glossary of topology
- Dense order
