= Derived set =

A derived set may refer to:

- Derived set (mathematics), a construction in point-set topology
- Derived row, a concept in musical set theory
