= Extremally disconnected space =

Topological space in which the closure of every open set is open

In mathematics, an extremally disconnected space is a topological space in which the closure of every open set is open. (The term "extremally disconnected" is correct, even though the word "extremally" does not appear in most dictionaries, and is sometimes mistaken by spellcheckers for the homophone extremely disconnected.)

An extremally disconnected space that is also compact and Hausdorff is sometimes called a Stonean space. This is not the same as a Stone space, which is a totally disconnected compact Hausdorff space. Every Stonean space is a Stone space, but not vice versa. In the duality between Stone spaces and Boolean algebras, the Stonean spaces correspond to the complete Boolean algebras.

An extremally disconnected first-countable collectionwise Hausdorff space must be discrete. In particular, for metric spaces, the property of being extremally disconnected (the closure of every open set is open) is equivalent to the property of being discrete (every set is open).

== Examples and non-examples ==
- Every discrete space is extremally disconnected. Every indiscrete space is both extremally disconnected and connected.
- The Stone–Čech compactification of a discrete space is extremally disconnected.
- The spectrum of an abelian von Neumann algebra is extremally disconnected.
- Any commutative AW*-algebra is isomorphic to $C(X)$, for some space $X$ which is extremally disconnected, compact and Hausdorff.
- Any infinite space with the cofinite topology is both extremally disconnected and connected. More generally, every hyperconnected space is extremally disconnected.
- The space on three points with base $\{\{x,y\},\{x,y,z\}\}$ provides a finite example of a space that is both extremally disconnected and connected. Another example is given by the Sierpinski space, since it is finite, connected, and hyperconnected.

The following spaces are not extremally disconnected:

- The Cantor set is not extremally disconnected. However, it is totally disconnected.

== Equivalent characterizations ==
A theorem due to Gleason (1958) says that the projective objects of the category of compact Hausdorff spaces are exactly the extremally disconnected compact Hausdorff spaces. A simplified proof of this fact is given by Rainwater (1959).

A compact Hausdorff space is extremally disconnected if and only if it is a retract of the Stone–Čech compactification of a discrete space.

== Applications ==
Hartig (1983) proves the Riesz–Markov–Kakutani representation theorem by reducing it to the case of extremally disconnected spaces, in which case the representation theorem can be proved by elementary means.

== See also ==
- Totally disconnected space
