= Condensation point =

Type of accumulation point

In mathematics, a condensation point p of a subset S of a topological space is any point p such that every neighborhood of p contains uncountably many points of S. Thus "condensation point" is synonymous with "$\aleph_1$-accumulation point".

== Examples ==
- If S = (0,1) is the open unit interval, a subset of the real numbers, then 0 is a condensation point of S.
- If S is an uncountable subset of a set X endowed with the indiscrete topology, then any point p of X is a condensation point of X as the only neighborhood of p is X itself.
