= Thomas John I'Anson Bromwich =

British mathematician (1875–1929)

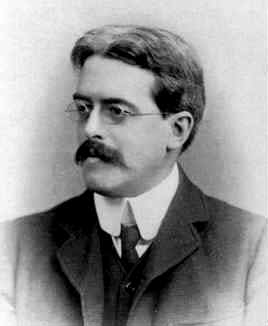
- Born: 8 February 1875; Wolverhampton, Staffordshire, England
- Died: 24 August 1929 (aged 54); Northampton, Northamptonshire, England
- Citizenship: British
- Education: St John's College, Cambridge
- Known for: Inverse Laplace transform
- Awards: Fellow of the Royal Society
- Scientific career
- Fields: Mathematics
- Workplaces: St John's College, Cambridge; Queen's College, Galway

Thomas John I'Anson Bromwich FRS (8 February 1875 – 24 August 1929) was an English mathematician, and a fellow of the Royal Society.

== Life ==
Thomas John I'Anson Bromwich was born on 8 February 1875, in Wolverhampton, England. He was descended from Bryan I'Anson, of Ashby St Ledgers, Sheriff of London and father of the 17th-century 1st Baronet Sir Bryan I'Anson of Bassetsbury.

His parents emigrated to South Africa, where in 1892 he graduated from high school. He attended St John's College, Cambridge, where in 1895 he became Senior Wrangler. In 1897, he became a lecturer at St John's. From 1902 to 1907, he was a professor of mathematics at Queen's College, Galway. In 1906, he was elected a fellow of the Royal Society. In 1907, he returned to Cambridge and again became a fellow and lecturer at St John's. He was a vice president of the Royal Society in 1919 and 1920. He died in Northampton on 24 August 1929, hanging himself in his bedroom.

== Work ==
Bromwich worked in both algebra and analysis. G. H. Hardy praised him for his versatility, excelling in both pure and applied mathematics.

Today, Bromwich is perhaps best known for justifying Oliver Heaviside's operator calculus, paving the way for the rigorous development of the theory behind the Laplace transform, a valuable mathematical tool for physics and engineering. He showed how to calculate the inverse Laplace transform by means of contour integration.

Other topics Bromwich investigated include solutions of Maxwell's equations, and the scattering of electromagnetic plane waves by spheres. (See Mie scattering.) He also investigated, and wrote a book on, the theory of quadratic forms.

In 1906 he derived the Bromwich inequality in the field of matrices which gives narrower bounds to characteristic roots than those given by Bendixson's inequality.

In 1908 he published An Introduction to the Theory of Infinite Series. In this book, Bromwich presented a combination of old and new topics, including divergent series. Some recent results obtained by Bromwich himself and others were included in an appendix. He employed Richard Dedekind's approach to defining irrational numbers (the Dedekind cuts). A second edition appeared in 1926. G. H. Hardy praised the book highly, while criticizing the way in which it was laid out. The book is still available for purchase.
