= Adherence =

Adherence, Adherer, and derivative terms may refer to:

== Healthcare ==
- Patient adherence, the obedience of the patient to the medical advice
- Adhesion (medicine), abnormal bands of tissue that grow in the human body

== Other uses ==
- Adherent point, mathematical notion, also known as closure point, point of closure or contact point
- Adhesion, the tendency of dissimilar particles or surfaces to cling to one another
- Religious adherence, when people follow a particular religion
