= Adherent point =

Point that belongs to the closure of some given subset of a topological space

In mathematics, an adherent point (also closure point or point of closure or contact point) of a subset $A$ of a topological space $X,$ is a point $x$ in $X$ such that every neighbourhood of $x$ (or equivalently, every open neighborhood of $x$) contains at least one point of $A.$ A point $x \in X$ is an adherent point for $A$ if and only if $x$ is in the closure of $A,$ thus

$x \in \operatorname{Cl}_X A$ if and only if for all open subsets $U \subseteq X,$ if $x \in U \text{ then } U \cap A \neq \varnothing.$

This definition differs from that of a limit point of a set, in that for a limit point it is required that every neighborhood of $x$ contains at least one point of $A$ different from $x.$ Thus every limit point is an adherent point, but the converse is not true. An adherent point of $A$ is either a limit point of $A$ or an element of $A$ (or both). An adherent point which is not a limit point is an isolated point.

Intuitively, having an open set $A$ defined as the area within (but not including) some boundary, the adherent points of $A$ are those of $A$ including the boundary.

== Examples and sufficient conditions ==
If $S$ is a non-empty subset of $\R$ which is bounded above, then the supremum $\sup S$ is adherent to $S.$ In the interval $(a, b],$ $a$ is an adherent point that is not in the interval, with usual topology of $\R.$

A subset $S$ of a metric space $M$ contains all of its adherent points if and only if $S$ is (sequentially) closed in $M.$

=== Adherent points and subspaces ===
Suppose $x \in X$ and $S \subseteq X \subseteq Y,$ where $X$ is a topological subspace of $Y$ (that is, $X$ is endowed with the subspace topology induced on it by $Y$). Then $x$ is an adherent point of $S$ in $X$ if and only if $x$ is an adherent point of $S$ in $Y.$

Proof

By assumption, $S \subseteq X \subseteq Y$ and $x \in X.$ Assuming that $x \in \operatorname{Cl}_X S,$ let $V$ be a neighborhood of $x$ in $Y$ so that $x \in \operatorname{Cl}_Y S$ will follow once it is shown that $V \cap S \neq \varnothing.$ The set $U := V \cap X$ is a neighborhood of $x$ in $X$ (by definition of the subspace topology) so that $x \in \operatorname{Cl}_X S$ implies that $\varnothing \neq U \cap S.$ Thus $\varnothing \neq U \cap S = (V \cap X) \cap S \subseteq V \cap S,$ as desired. For the converse, assume that $x \in \operatorname{Cl}_Y S$ and let $U$ be a neighborhood of $x$ in $X$ so that $x \in \operatorname{Cl}_X S$ will follow once it is shown that $U \cap S \neq \varnothing.$ By definition of the subspace topology, there exists a neighborhood $V$ of $x$ in $Y$ such that $U = V \cap X.$ Now $x \in \operatorname{Cl}_Y S$ implies that $\varnothing \neq V \cap S.$ From $S \subseteq X$ it follows that $S = X \cap S$ and so $\varnothing \neq V \cap S = V \cap (X \cap S) = (V \cap X) \cap S = U \cap S,$ as desired. $\blacksquare$

Consequently, $x$ is an adherent point of $S$ in $X$ if and only if this is true of $x$ in every (or alternatively, in some) topological superspace of $X.$

=== Adherent points and sequences ===
If $S$ is a subset of a topological space then the limit of a convergent sequence in $S$ does not necessarily belong to $S,$ however it is always an adherent point of $S.$ Let $\left(x_n\right)_{n \in \N}$ be such a sequence and let $x$ be its limit. Then by definition of limit, for all neighbourhoods $U$ of $x$ there exists $n \in \N$ such that $x_n \in U$ for all $n \geq N.$ In particular, $x_N \in U$ and also $x_N \in S,$ so $x$ is an adherent point of $S.$ In contrast to the previous example, the limit of a convergent sequence in $S$ is not necessarily a limit point of $S$; for example consider $S = \{ 0 \}$ as a subset of $\R.$ Then the only sequence in $S$ is the constant sequence $0, 0, \ldots$ whose limit is $0,$ but $0$ is not a limit point of $S;$ it is only an adherent point of $S.$

== See also ==
- Closed set – Complement of an open subset
- Closure (topology) – All points and limit points in a subset of a topological space
- Limit of a sequence – Value to which tends an infinite sequence
- Limit point of a set – Cluster point in a topological space
- Subsequential limit – The limit of some subsequence
