= Scattered space =

In mathematics, a scattered space is a topological space X that contains no nonempty dense-in-itself subset. Equivalently, every nonempty subset A of X contains a point isolated in A.

A subset of a topological space is called a scattered set if it is a scattered space with the subspace topology.

== Examples ==
- Every discrete space is scattered.
- Every ordinal number with the order topology is scattered. Indeed, every nonempty subset A contains a minimum element, and that element is isolated in A.
- A space X with the particular point topology, in particular the Sierpinski space, is scattered. This is an example of a scattered space that is not a T_{1} space.
- The closure of a scattered set is not necessarily scattered. For example, in the Euclidean plane $\R^2$ take a countably infinite discrete set A in the unit disk, with the points getting denser and denser as one approaches the boundary. For example, take the union of the vertices of a series of n-gons centered at the origin, with radius getting closer and closer to 1. Then the closure of A will contain the whole circle of radius 1, which is dense-in-itself.

== Properties ==
- In a topological space X the closure of a dense-in-itself subset is a perfect set. So X is scattered if and only if it does not contain any nonempty perfect set.
- Every subset of a scattered space is scattered. Being scattered is a hereditary property.
- Every scattered space X is a T_{0} space. (Proof: Given two distinct points x, y in X, at least one of them, say x, will be isolated in $\{x,y\}$. That means there is a neighborhood of x in X that does not contain y.)
- In a T_{0} space the union of two scattered sets is scattered. Note that the T_{0} assumption is necessary here. For example, if $X=\{a,b\}$ with the indiscrete topology, $\{a\}$ and $\{b\}$ are both scattered, but their union, $X$, is not scattered as it has no isolated point.
- Every T_{1} scattered space is totally disconnected.
  (Proof: If C is a nonempty connected subset of X, it contains a point x isolated in C. So the singleton $\{x\}$ is both open in C (because x is isolated) and closed in C (because of the T_{1} property). Because C is connected, it must be equal to $\{x\}$. This shows that every connected component of X has a single point.)
- Every second countable scattered space is countable.
- Every topological space X can be written in a unique way as the disjoint union of a perfect set and a scattered set.
- Every second countable space X can be written in a unique way as the disjoint union of a perfect set and a countable scattered open set.
  (Proof: Use the perfect + scattered decomposition and the fact above about second countable scattered spaces, together with the fact that a subset of a second countable space is second countable.)
  Furthermore, every closed subset of a second countable X can be written uniquely as the disjoint union of a perfect subset of X and a countable scattered subset of X. This holds in particular in any Polish space, which is the contents of the Cantor–Bendixson theorem.
