= Scattered =

Scattered may refer to:

== Music ==
- "Scattered" (The Kinks song), 1993
- Scattered, a 2010 album by The Handsome Family
- "Scattered", a song by Ace Young
- "Scattered", a song by Lauren Jauregui
- "Scattered", a song by Green Day from Nimrod
- "Scattered (Let's Think About Livin')", a song by Neil Young from his 1996 album Broken Arrow

== Television ==
- "Scattered" (Battlestar Galactica), a 2005 Battlestar Galactica episode

== See also ==
- Scatter (disambiguation)
- Scattered radiation
- Scattered space, a property of topological spaces
