= Poincaré theorem =

Poincaré theorem may refer to:

- Poincaré conjecture, on homeomorphisms to the sphere;
- Poincaré recurrence theorem, on sufficient conditions for recurrence to take place in dynamical systems;
- Poincaré-Bendixson theorem, on the existence of attractors for two-dimensional dynamical systems;
- Poincaré–Birkhoff–Witt theorem, concerning Lie algebras and their universal envelopes;
- Poincaré lemma.
