= Recurrent point =

Mathematical concept

In mathematics, a recurrent point for a function f is a point that is in its own limit set by f. Any neighborhood containing the recurrent point will also contain (a countable number of) iterates of it as well.

== Definition ==
Let $X$ be a Hausdorff space and $f\colon X\to X$ a function. A point $x\in X$ is said to be recurrent (for $f$) if $x\in \omega(x)$, i.e. if $x$ belongs to its $\omega$-limit set. This means that for each neighborhood $U$ of $x$ and ${\forall N }$ there exists $n>N$ such that $f^n(x)\in U$.

The set of recurrent points of $f$ is often denoted $R(f)$ and is called the recurrent set of $f$. Its closure is called the Birkhoff center of $f$, and appears in the work of George David Birkhoff on dynamical systems.

Every recurrent point is a nonwandering point, hence if $f$ is a homeomorphism and $X$ is compact, then $R(f)$ is an invariant subset of the non-wandering set of $f$ (and may be a proper subset) and it's already closed.
