= Collectionwise Hausdorff space =

In mathematics, in the field of topology, a topological space $X$ is said to be collectionwise Hausdorff if given any closed discrete subset of $X$, there is a pairwise disjoint family of open sets with each point of the discrete subset contained in exactly one of the open sets.

Here a subset $S\subseteq X$ being discrete has the usual meaning of being a discrete space with the subspace topology (i.e., all points of $S$ are isolated in $S$). (Note: If $X$ is T_{1} space, $S\subseteq X$ being closed and discrete is equivalent to the family of singletons $\{\{s\}:s\in S\}$ being a discrete family of subsets of $X$ (in the sense that every point of $X$ has a neighborhood that meets at most one set in the family). If $X$ is not T_{1}, the family of singletons being a discrete family is a weaker condition. For example, if $X=\{a,b\}$ with the indiscrete topology, $S=\{a\}$ is discrete but not closed, even though the corresponding family of singletons is a discrete family in $X$.)

== Properties ==
- Every T_{1} space that is collectionwise Hausdorff is also Hausdorff.
- Every collectionwise normal space is collectionwise Hausdorff. (This follows from the fact that given a closed discrete subset $S$ of $X$, every singleton $\{s\}$ $(s\in S)$ is closed in $X$ and the family of such singletons is a discrete family in $X$.)
- Metrizable spaces are collectionwise normal and hence collectionwise Hausdorff.
