= Limit set =

State of a dynamic system after an infinitely long time

In mathematics, especially in the study of dynamical systems, a limit set is the state a dynamical system reaches after an infinite amount of time has passed, by either going forward or backwards in time. Limit sets are important because they can be used to understand the long term behavior of a dynamical system. A system that has reached its limiting set is said to be at equilibrium.

== Types ==
- fixed points
- periodic orbits
- limit cycles
- attractors

In general, limits sets can be very complicated as in the case of strange attractors, but for 2-dimensional dynamical systems the Poincaré–Bendixson theorem provides a simple characterization of all nonempty, compact $\omega$-limit sets that contain at most finitely many fixed points as a fixed point, a periodic orbit, or a union of fixed points and homoclinic or heteroclinic orbits connecting those fixed points.

== Definition for iterated functions ==
Let $X$ be a metric space, and let $f:X\rightarrow X$ be a continuous function. The $\omega$-limit set of $x\in X$, denoted by $\omega(x,f)$, is the set of cluster points of the forward orbit $\{f^n(x)\}_{n\in \mathbb{N}}$ of the iterated function $f$. Hence, $y\in \omega(x,f)$ if and only if there is a strictly increasing sequence of natural numbers $\{n_k\}_{k\in \mathbb{N}}$ such that $f^{n_k}(x)\rightarrow y$ as $k\rightarrow\infty$. Another way to express this is

$$\omega(x,f) = \bigcap_{n\in \mathbb{N}} \overline{\{f^k(x): k>n\}},$$

where $\overline{S}$ denotes the closure of set $S$. The points in the limit set are non-wandering (but may not be recurrent points). This may also be formulated as the outer limit (limsup) of a sequence of sets, such that

$$\omega(x,f) = \bigcap_{n=1}^\infty \overline{\bigcup_{k=n}^\infty \{f^k(x)\}}.$$

If $f$ is a homeomorphism (that is, a bicontinuous bijection), then the $\alpha$-limit set is defined in a similar fashion, but for the backward orbit; i.e. $\alpha(x,f)=\omega(x,f^{-1})$.

Both sets are $f$-invariant, and if $X$ is compact, they are compact and nonempty.

== Definition for flows ==
Given a real dynamical system $(T,X,\varphi)$ with flow $\varphi:\mathbb{R}\times X\to X$, a point $x$, we call a point $y$ an $\omega$-limit point of $x$ if there exists a sequence $(t_n)_{n \in \mathbb{N}}$ in $\mathbb{R}$ so that

$$\lim_{n \to \infty} t_n = \infty$$
$$\lim_{n \to \infty} \varphi(t_n, x) = y$$.

For an orbit $\gamma$ of $(T,X,\varphi)$, we say that $y$ is an $\omega$-limit point of $\gamma$, if it is an $\omega$-limit point of some point on the orbit.

Analogously we call $y$ an $\alpha$-limit point of $x$ if there exists a sequence $(t_n)_{n \in \mathbb{N}}$ in $\mathbb{R}$ so that

$$\lim_{n \to \infty} t_n = -\infty$$
$$\lim_{n \to \infty} \varphi(t_n, x) = y$$.

For an orbit $\gamma$ of $(T,X,\varphi)$, we say that $y$ is an $\alpha$-limit point of $\gamma$, if it is an $\alpha$-limit point of some point on the orbit.

The set of all $\omega$-limit points ($\alpha$-limit points) for a given orbit $\gamma$ is called $\omega$-limit set ($\alpha$-limit set) for $\gamma$ and denoted $\lim_{\omega} \gamma$ ($\lim_{\alpha} \gamma$).

If the $\omega$-limit set ($\alpha$-limit set) is disjoint from the orbit $\gamma$, that is $\lim_{\omega} \gamma \cap \gamma =\varnothing$ ($\lim_{\alpha} \gamma \cap \gamma =\varnothing$), we call $\lim_{\omega} \gamma$ ($\lim_{\alpha} \gamma$) a ω-limit cycle (α-limit cycle).

Alternatively the limit sets can be defined as

$$\lim_\omega \gamma := \bigcap_{s\in \mathbb{R}}\overline{\{\varphi(x,t):t>s\}}$$

and

$$\lim_\alpha \gamma := \bigcap_{s\in \mathbb{R}}\overline{\{\varphi(x,t):t<s\}}.$$

=== Examples ===
- For any periodic orbit $\gamma$ of a dynamical system, $\lim_{\omega} \gamma =\lim_{\alpha} \gamma =\gamma$
- For any fixed point $x_0$ of a dynamical system, $\lim_{\omega} x_0 =\lim_{\alpha} x_0 =x_0$

=== Properties ===
- $\lim_{\omega} \gamma$ and $\lim_{\alpha} \gamma$ are closed
- if $X$ is compact then $\lim_{\omega} \gamma$ and $\lim_{\alpha} \gamma$ are nonempty, compact and connected
- $\lim_{\omega} \gamma$ and $\lim_{\alpha} \gamma$ are $\varphi$-invariant, that is $\varphi(\mathbb{R}\times\lim_{\omega} \gamma)=\lim_{\omega} \gamma$ and $\varphi(\mathbb{R}\times\lim_{\alpha} \gamma)=\lim_{\alpha} \gamma$

== See also ==
- Julia set
- Stable set
- Limit cycle
- Periodic point
- Non-wandering set
- Kleinian group
