= Scatter =

Scatter may refer to:

- Scattering, in physics, the study of collisions
- Statistical dispersion or scatter
- Scatter (modeling), a substance used in the building of dioramas and model railways
- Scatter, in computer programming, a parameter in network broadcasting
- Scatter (band), a Scottish improvisational music collective

== See also ==
- Scatter plot, a type of diagram
- Scattered (disambiguation)
