= Generalised metric =

Metric geometry

In mathematics, the concept of a generalised metric is a generalisation of that of a metric, in which the distance is not a real number but taken from an arbitrary ordered field.

In general, when we define metric space the distance function is taken to be a real-valued function. The real numbers form an ordered field which is Archimedean and order complete. These metric spaces have some nice properties like: in a metric space compactness, sequential compactness and countable compactness are equivalent etc. These properties may not, however, hold so easily if the distance function is taken in an arbitrary ordered field, instead of in $\scriptstyle \R.$

== Preliminary definition ==
Let $(F, +, \cdot, <)$ be an arbitrary ordered field, and $M$ a nonempty set; a function $d : M \times M \to F^+ \cup \{0\}$ is called a metric on $M,$ if the following conditions hold:

1. $d(x, y) = 0$ if and only if $x = y$;
2. $d(x, y) = d(y, x)$ (symmetry);
3. $d(x, y) + d(y, z) \geq d(x, z)$ (triangle inequality).

It is not difficult to verify that the open balls $B(x, \delta)\; := \{y \in M\; : d(x, y) < \delta\}$ form a basis for a suitable topology, the latter called the metric topology on $M,$ with the metric in $F.$

Since $F$ in its order topology is monotonically normal, we would expect $M$ to be at least regular.

== Further properties ==
However, under axiom of choice, every general metric is monotonically normal, for, given $x \in G,$ where $G$ is open, there is an open ball $B(x, \delta)$ such that $x \in B(x, \delta) \subseteq G.$ Take $\mu(x, G) = B\left(x, \delta/2\right).$ Verify the conditions for Monotone Normality.

The matter of wonder is that, even without choice, general metrics are monotonically normal.

proof.

Case I: $F$ is an Archimedean field.

Now, if $x$ in $G, G$ open, we may take $\mu(x, G) := B(x, 1/2n(x,G)),$ where $n(x, G) := \min\{n \in \N : B(x, 1/n) \subseteq G\},$ and the trick is done without choice.

Case II: $F$ is a non-Archimedean field.

For given $x \in G$ where $G$ is open, consider the set $A(x, G) := \{a \in F : \text{ for all } n \in \N, B(x, n \cdot a) \subseteq G\}.$

The set $A(x, G)$ is non-empty. For, as $G$ is open, there is an open ball $B(x, k)$ within $G.$ Now, as $F$ is non-Archimdedean, $\N_F$ is not bounded above, hence there is some $\xi \in F$ such that for all $n \in \N,$ $n \cdot 1 \leq \xi.$ Putting $a = k \cdot (2 \xi)^{-1},$ we see that $a$ is in $A(x, G).$

Now define $\mu(x, G) = \bigcup\{B(x, a) : a \in A(x, G)\}.$ We would show that with respect to this mu operator, the space is monotonically normal. Note that $\mu(x,G)\subseteq G.$

If $y$ is not in $G$ (open set containing $x$) and $x$ is not in $H$ (open set containing $y$), then we'd show that $\mu(x, G) \cap \mu(y, H)$ is empty. If not, say $z$ is in the intersection. Then
$$\exists a \in A(x, G) \colon d(x, z) < a;\;\;
\exists b \in A(y, H) \colon d(z, y) < b.$$

From the above, we get that $d(x, y) \leq d(x, z) + d(z, y) < 2 \cdot \max\{a, b\},$ which is impossible since this would imply that either $y$ belongs to $\mu(x, G) \subseteq G$ or $x$ belongs to $\mu(y, H) \subseteq H.$ This completes the proof.

== See also ==
- Ordered topological vector space
- Pseudometric space – Generalization of metric spaces in mathematics
- Uniform space – Topological space with a notion of uniform properties
