= Subsequential limit =

Limit of some subsequence

In mathematics, a subsequential limit of a sequence is the limit of some subsequence. Every subsequential limit is a cluster point, but not conversely. In first-countable spaces, the two concepts coincide.

In a topological space, if every subsequence has a subsequential limit to the same point, then the original sequence also converges to that limit. This need not hold in more generalized notions of convergence, such as the space of almost everywhere convergence.

The supremum of the set of all subsequential limits of some sequence is called the limit superior, or limsup. Similarly, the infimum of such a set is called the limit inferior, or liminf. See limit superior and limit inferior.

If $(X, d)$ is a metric space and there is a Cauchy sequence such that there is a subsequence converging to some $x,$ then the sequence also converges to $x.$

== See also ==
- Convergent filter – Use of filters to describe and characterize all basic topological notions and results
- List of limits
- Limit of a sequence – Value to which tends an infinite sequence
- Limit superior and limit inferior – Bounds of a sequence
- Net (mathematics) – Generalization of a sequence of points
- Filters in topology#Subordination analogs of results involving subsequences – Use of filters to describe and characterize all basic topological notions and results
