= Collectionwise normal space =

Property of topological spaces stronger than normality

In mathematics, a topological space $X$ is called collectionwise normal if for every discrete family F_{i} (i ∈ I) of closed subsets of $X$ there exists a pairwise disjoint family of open sets U_{i} (i ∈ I), such that F_{i} ⊆ U_{i}. Here a family $\mathcal{F}$ of subsets of $X$ is called discrete when every point of $X$ has a neighbourhood that intersects at most one of the sets from $\mathcal{F}$. An equivalent definition of collectionwise normal demands that the above U_{i} (i ∈ I) themselves form a discrete family, which is a priori stronger than pairwise disjoint.

Some authors assume that $X$ is also a T_{1} space as part of the definition, but no such assumption is made here.

The property is intermediate in strength between paracompactness and normality, and occurs in metrization theorems.

== Properties ==
- A collectionwise normal space is collectionwise Hausdorff.
- A collectionwise normal space is normal.
- A Hausdorff paracompact space is collectionwise normal. In particular, every metrizable space is collectionwise normal.
  Note: The Hausdorff condition is necessary here, since for example an infinite set with the cofinite topology is compact, hence paracompact, and T_{1}, but is not even normal.
- Every normal countably compact space (hence every normal compact space) is collectionwise normal.
  Proof: Use the fact that in a countably compact space any discrete family of nonempty subsets is finite.
- An F_{σ}-set in a collectionwise normal space is also collectionwise normal in the subspace topology. In particular, this holds for closed subsets.
- The Moore metrization theorem states that a collectionwise normal Moore space is metrizable.

== Hereditarily collectionwise normal space ==
A topological space X is called hereditarily collectionwise normal if every subspace of X with the subspace topology is collectionwise normal.

In the same way that hereditarily normal spaces can be characterized in terms of separated sets, there is an equivalent characterization for hereditarily collectionwise normal spaces. A family $F_i (i \in I)$ of subsets of X is called a separated family if for every i, we have $F_i \cap \operatorname{cl}(\bigcup_{j \ne i}F_j) = \empty$, with cl denoting the closure operator in X, in other words if the family of $F_i$ is discrete in its union. The following conditions are equivalent:

1. X is hereditarily collectionwise normal.
2. Every open subspace of X is collectionwise normal.
3. For every separated family $F_i$ of subsets of X, there exists a pairwise disjoint family of open sets $U_i (i \in I)$, such that $F_i \subseteq U_i$.

=== Examples of hereditarily collectionwise normal spaces ===
- Every linearly ordered topological space (LOTS)
- Every generalized ordered space (GO-space)
- Every metrizable space. This follows from the fact that metrizable spaces are collectionwise normal and being metrizable is a hereditary property.
- Every monotonically normal space
