= Perfect set property =

Property in descriptive set theory

In the mathematical field of descriptive set theory, a subset of a Polish space has the perfect set property if it is either countable or has a nonempty perfect subset. Note that having the perfect set property is not the same as being a perfect set.

As nonempty perfect sets in a Polish space always have the cardinality of the continuum, and the reals form a Polish space, a set of reals with the perfect set property cannot be a counterexample to the continuum hypothesis (stated in the form that every uncountable set of reals has the cardinality of the continuum).

The Cantor–Bendixson theorem states that closed sets of a Polish space $X$ have the perfect set property in a particularly strong form: any closed subset of $X$ can be written uniquely as the disjoint union of a perfect set and a countable set. In particular, every uncountable Polish space has the perfect set property, and can be written as the disjoint union of a perfect set and a countable open set.

As a consequence, if a subset $S \subseteq X$ of a Polish space $X$ is such that its derived sets eventually reach the empty set, that is, $S^{(\alpha)} = \varnothing$ for some ordinal $\alpha$, then $S$ is countable.

The axiom of choice implies the existence of sets of reals that do not have the perfect set property, such as Bernstein sets. However, in Solovay's model, which satisfies all axioms of ZF but not the axiom of choice, every set of reals has the perfect set property, so the use of the axiom of choice is necessary. Every analytic set has the perfect set property. It follows from the existence of sufficiently large cardinals that every projective set has the perfect set property.

== Generalizations ==
Let $\omega_1$ be the least uncountable ordinal. In an analog of Baire space derived from the $\omega_1$-fold Cartesian product of $\omega_1$ with itself, any closed set is the disjoint union of an $\omega_1$-perfect set and a set of cardinality $\leq\aleph_1$, where $\omega_1$-closedness of a set is defined via a topological game in which members of $\omega_1^{\omega_1}$ are played.
