= Poincaré–Bendixson theorem =

Theorem on the behavior of dynamical systems

In mathematics, the Poincaré–Bendixson theorem is a statement about the long-term behaviour of orbits of continuous dynamical systems on the plane, cylinder, or two-sphere.

== Theorem ==
Given a differentiable real dynamical system defined on an open subset of the plane, every non-empty compact ω-limit set of an orbit, which contains only finitely many fixed points, is either

- a fixed point,
- a periodic orbit, or
- a connected set composed of a finite number of fixed points together with homoclinic and heteroclinic orbits connecting these.

Moreover, there is at most one orbit connecting different fixed points in the same direction. However, there could be countably many homoclinic orbits connecting one fixed point.

== Discussion ==
A weaker version of the theorem was originally conceived by Henri Poincaré (1892), although he lacked a complete proof which was later given by Ivar Bendixson (1901).

Continuous dynamical systems that are defined on two-dimensional manifolds other than the plane (or cylinder or two-sphere), as well as those defined on higher-dimensional manifolds, may exhibit ω-limit sets that defy the three possible cases under the Poincaré–Bendixson theorem. On a torus, for example, it is possible to have a recurrent non-periodic orbit, and three-dimensional systems may have strange attractors. Nevertheless, it is possible to classify the minimal sets of continuous dynamical systems on any two-dimensional compact and connected manifold due to a generalization of Arthur J. Schwartz.

== Applications ==
One important implication is that a two-dimensional continuous dynamical system cannot give rise to a strange attractor. If a strange attractor C did exist in such a system, then it could be enclosed in a closed and bounded subset of the phase space. By making this subset small enough, any nearby stationary points could be excluded. But then the Poincaré–Bendixson theorem says that C is not a strange attractor at all—it is either a limit cycle or it converges to a limit cycle.

The Poincaré–Bendixson theorem does not apply to discrete dynamical systems, where chaotic behaviour can arise in two- or even one-dimensional systems.

== See also ==
- Rotation number
- Limit cycle § Finding limit cycles
