= Accumulation point =

Cluster point in a topological space

In mathematics, a limit point, accumulation point, or cluster point of a set $S$ in a topological space $X$ is a point $x$ that can be "approximated" by points of $S$ in the sense that every neighbourhood of $x$ contains a point of $S$ other than $x$ itself. A limit point of a set $S$ does not itself have to be an element of $S.$ There is also a closely related concept for sequences. A cluster point or accumulation point of a sequence $(x_n)_{n \in \N}$ in a topological space $X$ is a point $x$ such that, for every neighbourhood $V$ of $x,$ there are infinitely many natural numbers $n$ such that $x_n \in V.$ This definition of a cluster or accumulation point of a sequence generalizes to nets and filters.

The similarly named notion of a limit point of a sequence (respectively, a limit point of a filter, a limit point of a net) by definition refers to a point that the sequence converges to (respectively, the filter converges to, the net converges to). Importantly, although "limit point of a set" is synonymous with "cluster/accumulation point of a set", this is not true for sequences (nor nets or filters). That is, the term "limit point of a sequence" is not synonymous with "cluster/accumulation point of a sequence".

The limit points of a set should not be confused with adherent points (also called points of closure) for which every neighbourhood of $x$ contains some point of $S$. Unlike for limit points, an adherent point $x$ of $S$ may have a neighbourhood not containing points other than $x$ itself. A limit point can be characterized as an adherent point that is not an isolated point.

Limit points of a set should also not be confused with boundary points. For example, $0$ is a boundary point (but not a limit point) of the set $\{0\}$ in $\R$ with standard topology. However, $0.5$ is a limit point (though not a boundary point) of interval $[0, 1]$ in $\R$ with standard topology (for a less trivial example of a limit point, see the first caption).

This concept profitably generalizes the notion of a limit and is the underpinning of concepts such as closed set and topological closure. Indeed, a set is closed if and only if it contains all of its limit points, and the topological closure operation can be thought of as an operation that enriches a set by uniting it with its limit points.

With respect to the usual Euclidean topology, the sequence of rational numbers $x_n=(-1)^n \frac{n}{n+1}$ has no limit (i.e. does not converge), but has two accumulation points (which are considered limit points here), viz. -1 and +1. Thus, thinking of sets, these points are limit points of the set $S = \{x_n\}.$

== Definition ==
=== Accumulation points of a set ===
A sequence enumerating all positive rational numbers. Each positive real number is a cluster point.

Let $S$ be a subset of a topological space $X.$ A point $x$ in $X$ is a limit point or cluster point or accumulation point of the set $S$ if every neighbourhood of $x$ contains at least one point of $S$ different from $x$ itself.

It does not make a difference if we restrict the condition to open neighbourhoods only. It is often convenient to use the "open neighbourhood" form of the definition to show that a point is a limit point and to use the "general neighbourhood" form of the definition to derive facts from a known limit point.

If $X$ is a $T_1$ space (such as a metric space), then $x \in X$ is a limit point of $S$ if and only if every neighbourhood of $x$ contains infinitely many points of $S.$ In fact, $T_1$ spaces are characterized by this property.

If $X$ is a Fréchet–Urysohn space (which all metric spaces and first-countable spaces are), then $x \in X$ is a limit point of $S$ if and only if there is a sequence of points in $S \setminus \{x\}$ whose limit is $x.$ In fact, Fréchet–Urysohn spaces are characterized by this property.

The set of limit points of $S$ is called the derived set of $S.$

==== Special types of accumulation point of a set ====
If every neighbourhood of $x$ contains infinitely many points of $S,$ then $x$ is a specific type of limit point called an ω-accumulation point of $S.$

If every neighbourhood of $x$ contains uncountably many points of $S,$ then $x$ is a specific type of limit point called a condensation point of $S.$

If every neighbourhood $U$ of $x$ is such that the cardinality of $U \cap S$ equals the cardinality of $S,$ then $x$ is a specific type of limit point called a complete accumulation point of $S.$

=== Accumulation points of sequences and nets ===
In a topological space $X,$ a point $x \in X$ is said to be a cluster point or accumulation point of a sequence $x_{\bull} = \left(x_n\right)_{n=1}^{\infty}$ if, for every neighbourhood $V$ of $x,$ there are infinitely many $n \in \N$ such that $x_n \in V.$ It is equivalent to say that for every neighbourhood $V$ of $x$ and every $n_0 \in \N,$ there is some $n \geq n_0$ such that $x_n \in V.$ If $X$ is a metric space or a first-countable space (or, more generally, a Fréchet–Urysohn space), then $x$ is a cluster point of $x_{\bull}$ if and only if $x$ is a limit of some subsequence of $x_{\bull}.$ The set of all cluster points of a sequence is sometimes called the limit set.

Note that there is already the notion of limit of a sequence to mean a point $x$ to which the sequence converges (that is, every neighborhood of $x$ contains all but finitely many elements of the sequence). That is why we do not use the term limit point of a sequence as a synonym for accumulation point of the sequence.

The concept of a net generalizes the idea of a sequence. A net is a function $f : (P,\leq) \to X,$ where $(P,\leq)$ is a directed set and $X$ is a topological space. A point $x \in X$ is said to be a cluster point or accumulation point of a net $f$ if, for every neighbourhood $V$ of $x$ and every $p_0 \in P,$ there is some $p \geq p_0$ such that $f(p) \in V,$ equivalently, if $f$ has a subnet which converges to $x.$ Cluster points in nets encompass the idea of both condensation points and ω-accumulation points. Clustering and limit points are also defined for filters.

== Relation between accumulation point of a sequence and accumulation point of a set ==
Every sequence $x_{\bull} = \left(x_n\right)_{n=1}^{\infty}$ in $X$ is by definition just a map $x_{\bull} : \N \to X$ so that its image $\operatorname{Im} x_{\bull} := \left\{ x_n : n \in \N \right\}$ can be defined in the usual way.

- If there exists an element $x \in X$ that occurs infinitely many times in the sequence, $x$ is an accumulation point of the sequence. But $x$ need not be an accumulation point of the corresponding set $\operatorname{Im} x_{\bull}.$ For example, if the sequence is the constant sequence with value $x,$ we have $\operatorname{Im} x_{\bull} = \{ x \}$ and $x$ is an isolated point of $\operatorname{Im} x_{\bull}$ and not an accumulation point of $\operatorname{Im} x_{\bull}.$
- If no element occurs infinitely many times in the sequence, for example if all the elements are distinct, any accumulation point of the sequence is an $\omega$-accumulation point of the associated set $\operatorname{Im} x_{\bull}.$

Conversely, given a countable infinite set $A \subseteq X$ in $X,$ we can enumerate all the elements of $A$ in many ways, even with repeats, and thus associate with it many sequences $x_{\bull}$ that will satisfy $A = \operatorname{Im} x_{\bull}.$

- Any $\omega$-accumulation point of $A$ is an accumulation point of any of the corresponding sequences (because any neighborhood of the point will contain infinitely many elements of $A$ and hence also infinitely many terms in any associated sequence).
- A point $x \in X$ that is not an $\omega$-accumulation point of $A$ cannot be an accumulation point of any of the associated sequences without infinite repeats (because $x$ has a neighborhood that contains only finitely many (possibly even none) points of $A$ and that neighborhood can only contain finitely many terms of such sequences).

== Properties ==
Every limit of a non-constant sequence is an accumulation point of the sequence. And by definition, every limit point is an adherent point.

The closure $\operatorname{cl}(S)$ of a set $S$ is a disjoint union of its limit points $L(S)$ and isolated points $I(S)$; that is,
$$\operatorname{cl} (S) = L(S) \cup I(S)\quad\text{and}\quad L(S) \cap I(S) = \emptyset.$$

A point $x \in X$ is a limit point of $S \subseteq X$ if and only if it is in the closure of $S \setminus \{ x \}.$

Proof

We use the fact that a point is in the closure of a set if and only if every neighborhood of the point meets the set. Now, $x$ is a limit point of $S,$ if and only if every neighborhood of $x$ contains a point of $S$ other than $x,$ if and only if every neighborhood of $x$ contains a point of $S \setminus \{x\},$ if and only if $x$ is in the closure of $S \setminus \{x\}.$

If we use $L(S)$ to denote the set of limit points of $S,$ then we have the following characterization of the closure of $S$: The closure of $S$ is equal to the union of $S$ and $L(S).$ This fact is sometimes taken as the definition of closure.

Proof

("Left subset") Suppose $x$ is in the closure of $S.$ If $x$ is in $S,$ we are done. If $x$ is not in $S,$ then every neighbourhood of $x$ contains a point of $S,$ and this point cannot be $x.$ In other words, $x$ is a limit point of $S$ and $x$ is in $L(S).$

("Right subset") If $x$ is in $S,$ then every neighbourhood of $x$ clearly meets $S,$ so $x$ is in the closure of $S.$ If $x$ is in $L(S),$ then every neighbourhood of $x$ contains a point of $S$ (other than $x$), so $x$ is again in the closure of $S.$ This completes the proof.

A corollary of this result gives us a characterisation of closed sets: A set $S$ is closed if and only if it contains all of its limit points.

Proof

Proof 1: $S$ is closed if and only if $S$ is equal to its closure if and only if $S=S\cup L(S)$ if and only if $L(S)$ is contained in $S.$

Proof 2: Let $S$ be a closed set and $x$ a limit point of $S.$ If $x$ is not in $S,$ then the complement to $S$ comprises an open neighbourhood of $x.$ Since $x$ is a limit point of $S,$ any open neighbourhood of $x$ should have a non-trivial intersection with $S.$ However, a set can not have a non-trivial intersection with its complement. Conversely, assume $S$ contains all its limit points. We shall show that the complement of $S$ is an open set. Let $x$ be a point in the complement of $S.$ By assumption, $x$ is not a limit point, and hence there exists an open neighbourhood $U$ of $x$ that does not intersect $S,$ and so $U$ lies entirely in the complement of $S.$ Since this argument holds for arbitrary $x$ in the complement of $S,$ the complement of $S$ can be expressed as a union of open neighbourhoods of the points in the complement of $S.$ Hence the complement of $S$ is open.

No isolated point is a limit point of any set.

Proof

If $x$ is an isolated point, then $\{x\}$ is a neighbourhood of $x$ that contains no points other than $x.$

A space $X$ is discrete if and only if no subset of $X$ has a limit point.

Proof

If $X$ is discrete, then every point is isolated and cannot be a limit point of any set. Conversely, if $X$ is not discrete, then there is a singleton $\{ x \}$ that is not open. Hence, every open neighbourhood of $\{ x \}$ contains a point $y \neq x,$ and so $x$ is a limit point of $X.$

If a space $X$ has the trivial topology and $S$ is a subset of $X$ with more than one element, then all elements of $X$ are limit points of $S.$ If $S$ is a singleton, then every point of $X \setminus S$ is a limit point of $S.$

Proof

As long as $S \setminus \{ x \}$ is nonempty, its closure will be $X.$ It is only empty when $S$ is empty or $x$ is the unique element of $S.$

== See also ==
- Adherent point – Point that belongs to the closure of some given subset of a topological space
- Condensation point – Type of accumulation point
- Convergent filter – Application of set theory concept
- Derived set (mathematics) – Set of all limit points of a set
- Filters in topology – Application of set theory concept
- Isolated point – Point of a subset S around which there are no other points of S
- Limit of a function – Point to which functions converge in analysis
- Limit of a sequence – Value to which an infinite sequence tends
- Subsequential limit – Limit of some subsequence
