= Bendixson's inequality =

In mathematics, Bendixson's inequality is a quantitative result in the field of matrices derived by Ivar Bendixson in 1902. The inequality puts limits on the imaginary and real parts of characteristic roots (eigenvalues) of real matrices. A special case of this inequality leads to the result that characteristic roots of a real symmetric matrix are always real.

The inequality relating to the imaginary parts of characteristic roots of real matrices is stated as:

Let $A = \left ( a_{ij} \right )$ be a real $n \times n$ matrix and $\alpha = \max_{{1\leq i,j \leq n}} \frac{1}{2} \left | a_{ij} - a_{ji} \right |$. If $\lambda$ is any characteristic root of $A$, then

$\left | \operatorname{Im} (\lambda) \right | \le \alpha \sqrt{\frac{n(n-1)} 2 }.\,{}$

If $A$ is symmetric then $\alpha = 0$ and consequently the inequality implies that $\lambda$ must be real.

The inequality relating to the real parts of characteristic roots of real matrices (Theorem II in) is stated as:

Let $m$ and $M$ be the smallest and largest characteristic roots of $\tfrac{A+A^H}{2}$, then

$$m \leq\operatorname{Re}(\lambda) \leq M$$.

== See also ==
- Gershgorin circle theorem
