= Interval (mathematics) =

All numbers between two given numbers

The addition x + a on the number line. All numbers greater than x and less than x + a fall within that open interval.

Numeric intervals on the positive and negative sides of the number line.

In mathematics, an interval is the set of all real numbers lying between two fixed lower or upper bounds ("endpoints" or boundary points) with no "gaps". (Note: Unless explicitly otherwise specified, all intervals considered in this article are real intervals, that is, intervals of real numbers. Notable generalizations are summarized in a section below possibly with links to separate articles.) For example, the set of real numbers consisting of 0, 1, and all numbers in between is an interval, denoted [0, 1] and called the unit interval. An interval may contain neither endpoint (called an open interval), both endpoints (called a closed interval), or either endpoint (called a semi-open or semi-closed interval).

The intervals just described are the bounded intervals. Often intervals are also allowed to extend without bound in one or both directions, with the unbounded side being denoted by a positive or negative infinity symbol. The set of all positive real numbers is an interval in this sense, denoted (0, ∞); the set of all real numbers is an interval that is unbounded on both ends, denoted (−∞, ∞).

Intervals are ubiquitous in mathematical analysis. For example, they occur implicitly in the epsilon-delta definition of continuity; the intermediate value theorem asserts that the image of an interval by a continuous function is an interval; integrals of real functions are defined over an interval; etc. For example, interval arithmetic consists of computing with intervals instead of real numbers for providing a guaranteed enclosure of the result of a numerical computation, even in the presence of uncertainties of input data and rounding errors.

Intervals can be defined more generally on any totally ordered set, such as integers or rational numbers. The notation of integer intervals is considered in the special section below.

== Definitions and terminology ==
=== Definition of an interval ===
An interval is a subset of the real numbers that contains all real numbers lying between any two numbers of the subset. Examples are the numbers $x$ from one to two, $1 \leq x \leq 2$, and the numbers $y$ greater than 10, i.e. $y > 10$. Under this definition, the empty set and the entire set of real numbers are both intervals.

The endpoints of an interval are its supremum (least upper bound), and its infimum (greatest lower bound), if they exist as real numbers. If the infimum does not exist and the interval is not empty, one says often that the corresponding endpoint is negative infinity, written $-\infty.$ Similarly, if the supremum of a non-empty interval does not exist, one says that the corresponding endpoint is positive infinity, written $+\infty.$

Non-empty intervals are completely determined by their endpoints and whether each endpoint belongs to the interval. This is a consequence of the least-upper-bound property of the real numbers, which implies that if the elements of a non-empty interval are all less than some finite value, then the interval has a supremum. This characterization is used to specify intervals by means of interval notation, where a square or rounded bracket (parenthesis) indicates whether or not an endpoint belongs to the interval.

=== Open and closed intervals ===
An open interval does not include any endpoint and can be succinctly indicated with parentheses. For example, $(0, 1) = \{x \mid 0 < x < 1\}$ is the interval of all real numbers greater than $0$ and less than $1$. (This interval can also be denoted by $]0,1[$, see below). The open interval $(0, +\infty)$ consists of real numbers greater than $0$, i.e., positive real numbers. The open intervals have thus one of the forms

$$\begin{align}
(a,b)        &= \{x\in\mathbb R \mid a<x<b\}, \\
(-\infty, b) &= \{x\in\mathbb R \mid x<b\}, \\
(a, +\infty) &= \{x\in\mathbb R \mid a<x\}, \\
(-\infty, +\infty) &= \R, \\
(a,a)&=\emptyset,
\end{align}$$

where $a$ and $b$ are real numbers such that $a< b.$ In the last case, the resulting interval is the empty set and does not depend on $a$. The open intervals are those intervals that are open sets for the usual topology on the real numbers, and they form a base of the open sets.

A closed interval is an interval which includes both endpoints, which are finite. A closed interval is denoted with square brackets. For example, [0, 1] is the closed interval with contents greater than or equal to 0 and less than or equal to 1. Closed intervals are by definition non-empty. Thus every closed interval has the form

$$\begin{align}
\;[a,b]        &= \{x\in\mathbb R \mid a\le x\le b\}
\end{align}$$

where $a<b$. The interval consisting of a single point $[a,a]=\{a\}$ is sometimes called a degenerate closed interval.

In addition to the closed intervals $[a,b]$ common in analysis, unbounded intervals that include their finite endpoint such as $[a,\infty)$ or $(-\infty,b]$ are topologically closed (meaning that they contain all of their boundary points that are real numbers) but are not usually called "closed intervals" in analysis, that term being reserved for the closed and bounded case. The (bounded) closed intervals together with the semi-infinite closed intervals, and the interval $(-\infty,\infty)$ comprise those intervals that are closed sets for the usual topology on the real numbers.

=== Half-open intervals ===
A half-open interval has two distinct finite endpoints, and includes one but not the other. It is said to be left-open or right-open depending on whether the excluded endpoint is on the left or on the right. These intervals are denoted by mixing notations for open and closed intervals. For example, (0, 1] means greater than 0 and less than or equal to 1, while [0, 1) means greater than or equal to 0 and less than 1. The half-open intervals have the form

$$\begin{align}
\left(a,b\right]       &= \{x\in\R \mid a<x\le b\}, \\
\left[a,b\right)       &= \{x\in\R \mid a\le x<b\}. \\
\end{align}$$

In summary, a set of the real numbers is an interval, if and only if it is an open interval, a closed interval, or a half-open interval. The only intervals that appear twice in the above classification are $\emptyset$ and $\R$ that are both open and closed.

=== Degenerate intervals ===
A degenerate interval is any set consisting of a single real number (i.e., an interval of the form [a, a]). Some authors include the empty set in this definition. A real interval that is neither empty nor degenerate is said to be proper, and has infinitely many elements.

=== Bounded intervals ===
An interval is said to be left-bounded or right-bounded, if there is some real number that is, respectively, smaller than or larger than all its elements. An interval is said to be bounded, if it is both left- and right-bounded; and is said to be unbounded otherwise. Intervals that are bounded at only one end are said to be half-bounded. The empty set is bounded, and the set of all reals is the only interval that is unbounded at both ends. Bounded intervals are also commonly known as finite intervals.

Bounded intervals are bounded sets, in the sense that their diameter (which is equal to the absolute difference between the endpoints) is finite. The diameter may be called the length, width, measure, range, or size of the interval. The size of unbounded intervals is usually defined as +∞, and the size of the empty interval may be defined as 0 (or left undefined).

The centre (midpoint) of a bounded interval with endpoints a and b is (a + b)/2, and its radius is the half-length |a − b|/2. These concepts are undefined for empty or unbounded intervals.

=== Categorisation by minimum and maximum elements ===
An interval is said to be left-open if and only if it contains no minimum (an element that is smaller than all other elements); right-open if it contains no maximum; and open if it contains neither. The interval [0, 1) = {x | 0 ≤ x < 1}, for example, is left-closed and right-open. The set of non-negative reals is a closed interval that is right-open but not left-open.

An interval is said to be left-closed if it has a minimum element or is left-unbounded, right-closed if it has a maximum or is right unbounded; it is simply closed if it is both left-closed and right closed.

=== Sub-intervals and related constructions ===
An interval I is a subinterval of interval J if I is a subset of J. An interval I is a proper subinterval of J if I is a proper subset of J.

The interior of an interval I is the largest open interval that is contained in I; it is also the set of points in I which are not endpoints of I. The closure of I is the smallest closed interval that contains I; which is also the set I augmented with its finite endpoints.

For any set X of real numbers, the interval enclosure or interval span of X is the unique interval that contains X, and does not properly contain any other interval that also contains X.

=== Segments and intervals ===
There is conflicting terminology for the terms segment and interval, which have been employed in the literature in two essentially opposite ways, resulting in ambiguity when these terms are used. The Encyclopedia of Mathematics defines interval (without a qualifier) to exclude both endpoints (i.e., open interval) and segment to include both endpoints (i.e., closed interval), while Rudin's Principles of Mathematical Analysis calls sets of the form [a, b] intervals and sets of the form (a, b) segments throughout. These terms tend to appear in older works; modern texts increasingly favor the term interval (qualified by open, closed, or half-open), regardless of whether endpoints are included.

== Notations for intervals ==
The interval of numbers between a and b, including a and b, is often denoted [a, b]. The two numbers are called the endpoints of the interval. In countries where numbers are written with a decimal comma, a semicolon may be used as a separator to avoid ambiguity.

=== Including or excluding endpoints ===
To indicate that one of the endpoints is to be excluded from the set, the corresponding square bracket can be either replaced with a parenthesis, or reversed. Both notations are described in International standard ISO 31-11. Thus, in set builder notation,

$$\begin{align}
(a,b) = \mathopen{]}a,b\mathclose{[} &= \{x\in\R \mid a<x<b\},    \\[5mu]
[a,b) = \mathopen{[}a,b\mathclose{[} &= \{x\in\R \mid a\le x<b\}, \\[5mu]
(a,b] = \mathopen{]}a,b\mathclose{]} &= \{x\in\R \mid a<x\le b\}, \\[5mu]
[a,b] = \mathopen{[}a,b\mathclose{]} &= \{x\in\R \mid a\le x\le b\}.
\end{align}$$

Each interval (a, a), [a, a), and (a, a] represents the empty set, whereas [a, a] denotes the singleton set {a}. When a > b, all four notations are usually taken to represent the empty set.

Both notations may overlap with other uses of parentheses and brackets in mathematics. For instance, the notation (a, b) is often used to denote an ordered pair in set theory, the coordinates of a point or vector in analytic geometry and linear algebra, or (sometimes) a complex number in algebra. That is why Bourbaki introduced the notation ]a, b[ to denote the open interval. The notation [a, b] too is occasionally used for ordered pairs, especially in computer science.

Some authors such as Yves Tillé use ]a, b[ to denote the complement of the interval (a, b); namely, the set of all real numbers that are either less than or equal to a, or greater than or equal to b.

=== Infinite endpoints ===
In some contexts, an interval may be defined as a subset of the extended real numbers, the set of all real numbers augmented with −∞ and +∞.

In this interpretation, the notations [−∞, b] , (−∞, b] , [a, +∞] , and [a, +∞) are all meaningful and distinct. In particular, (−∞, +∞) denotes the set of all ordinary real numbers, while [−∞, +∞] denotes the extended reals.

Even in the context of the ordinary reals, one may use an infinite endpoint to indicate that there is no bound in that direction. For example, (0, +∞) is the set of positive real numbers, also written as $\mathbb{R}_+.$ The context affects some of the above definitions and terminology. For instance, the interval (−∞, +∞) = $\R$ is closed in the realm of ordinary reals, but not in the realm of the extended reals.

=== Integer intervals ===
When a and b are integers, the notations ⟦a, b⟧, [a .. b], {a .. b}, or just a .. b, are sometimes used to indicate the interval of all integers between a and b included. The notation [a .. b] is used in some programming languages; in Pascal, for example, it is used to formally define a subrange type, most frequently used to specify lower and upper bounds of valid indices of an array.

Another way to interpret integer intervals are as sets defined by enumeration, using ellipsis notation.

An integer interval that has a finite lower or upper endpoint always includes that endpoint. Therefore, the exclusion of endpoints can be explicitly denoted by writing a .. b − 1 , a + 1 .. b , or a + 1 .. b − 1. Alternate-bracket notations like [a .. b) or [a .. b[ are rarely used for integer intervals.

== Properties ==
The intervals are precisely the connected subsets of $\R.$ It follows that the image of an interval by any continuous function from $\mathbb R$ to $\mathbb R$ is also an interval. This is one formulation of the intermediate value theorem.

The intervals are also the convex subsets of $\R.$ The interval enclosure of a subset $X\subseteq \R$ is also the convex hull of $X.$

The closure of an interval is the union of the interval and the set of its finite endpoints, and hence is also an interval. (The latter also follows from the fact that the closure of every connected subset of a topological space is a connected subset.) In other words, we have

$$\operatorname{cl}(a,b)=\operatorname{cl}(a,b]=\operatorname{cl}[a,b)=\operatorname{cl}[a,b]=[a,b],$$
$$\operatorname{cl}(a,+\infty)=\operatorname{cl}[a,+\infty)=[a,+\infty),$$
$$\operatorname{cl}(-\infty,a)=\operatorname{cl}(-\infty,a]=(-\infty,a],$$
$$\operatorname{cl}(-\infty,+\infty)=(-\infty,\infty).$$

The intersection of any collection of intervals is always an interval. The union of two intervals is an interval if and only if they have a non-empty intersection or an open end-point of one interval is a closed end-point of the other, for example $(a,b) \cup [b,c] = (a,c].$

If $\R$ is viewed as a metric space, its open balls are the open bounded intervals (c + r, c − r), and its closed balls are the closed bounded intervals [c + r, c − r]. In particular, the metric and order topologies in the real line coincide, which is the standard topology of the real line.

Any element x of an interval I defines a partition of I into three disjoint intervals I_{1}, I_{2}, I_{3}: respectively, the elements of I that are less than x, the singleton $[x,x] = \{x\},$ and the elements that are greater than x. The parts I_{1} and I_{3} are both non-empty (and have non-empty interiors), if and only if x is in the interior of I. This is an interval version of the trichotomy principle.

== Applications ==
=== Dyadic intervals ===
A dyadic interval is a bounded real interval whose endpoints are $\tfrac{j}{2^n}$ and $\tfrac{j+1}{2^n},$ where $j$ and $n$ are integers. Depending on the context, either endpoint may or may not be included in the interval.

Dyadic intervals have the following properties:

- The length of a dyadic interval is always an integer power of two.
- Each dyadic interval is contained in exactly one dyadic interval of twice the length.
- Each dyadic interval is spanned by two dyadic intervals of half the length.
- If two open dyadic intervals overlap, then one of them is a subset of the other.

The dyadic intervals consequently have a structure that reflects that of an infinite binary tree.

Dyadic intervals are relevant to several areas of numerical analysis, including adaptive mesh refinement, multigrid methods and wavelet analysis. Another way to represent such a structure is p-adic analysis (for p = 2).

=== Real analysis ===
Intervals are ubiquitous in mathematical analysis, where they are used to express ideas and often occur in key results.

The integral of a real function is defined over an interval. The endpoints of the interval involved usually occur as a subscript and superscript, so the integral $\int_a^b f(x) \, dx$ applies to all $x$ belonging to the interval $[a, b]$.

Intervals occur implicitly in the epsilon-delta definition of continuity of a function $f(x)$: the following account makes them explicit. The function $f$ is said to be continuous at a point $a$ if for any given value $\varepsilon > 0$ (epsilon greater than zero) there is a value $\delta > 0$ (delta greater than zero) for which $f(x)$ lies in the open interval $\left( f(a)-\varepsilon , f(a)+\varepsilon \right)$ whenever $x$ is chosen from the interval $\left( a-\delta, a+\delta \right)$. The possible values of $\varepsilon$ and $\delta$ themselves belong to the unbounded interval $(0, +\infty)$, but are usually considered to describe small positive increments. The idea is that a small symmetric interval around point $a$ exists where the value of $f(x)$ stays within an open interval of radius $\varepsilon$ centred around $f(a)$.

The intermediate value theorem captures the intuition that if $f\colon [a, b]\to \R$ is a real valued continuous function on an interval $[a, b]$ and $d$ is any value between $f(a)$ and $f(b)$, then we expect to find a value $c$ between $a$ and $b$ where $f(c)=d$. For example, if $f(x)=x^2$ is defined on the interval $[3,4]$, then given $d=10$ between $f(3)=3^2=9$ and $f(4)=4^2=16$, there is a value $c$ between $3$ and $4$ where $f(c)=c^2=10$. An equivalent formulation of the theorem asserts that the image of an interval by a continuous function is an interval.

=== Confidence intervals ===
Confidence intervals are important in statistical inference and provide a range of estimated values for an unknown statistical parameter, such as a population mean. Unlike other kinds of interval, a confidence interval is evaluated from a random sample and the interval endpoints are real-valued random variables. A different sample may well give a different result.

When sampling is repeated there is a pre-set probability, known as the confidence level, that a corresponding interval contains the true value of the unknown parameter. For example, if the chosen confidence level were 0.95 and the same sampling procedure were repeated many times, in the long run approximately 95% of the resulting intervals would be expected to contain the true value.

The normal distribution provides a simplified illustration. It has a probability density function whose graph is the familiar bell curve. The peak occurs at its mean $\mu$ (the Greek letter mu) and its width can be described by its standard deviation $\sigma$ (sigma). These two parameters distinguish one bell curve from another, but in all cases the region within two standard deviations either side of the mean represents a probability of approximately 0.95. This can be written

$$P(\mu-2\sigma \leq X \leq \mu+2\sigma) \approx 0.95$$

for a normally distributed random variable $X$.

Take $\bar{X}$ to be the sample mean for a fixed sample size, which is an estimator for $\mu$. It also has a normal distribution with its own standard deviation $\sigma_\bar{X}$. The previous inequalities can then be written in terms of $\mu$ to give

$$P(\bar{X}-2\sigma_\bar{X} \leq \mu \leq \bar{X}+2\sigma_\bar{X}) \approx 0.95.$$

If the value of the standard deviation $\sigma_\bar{X}$ is known, then the interval $[\bar{X}-2\sigma_\bar{X}, \bar{X}+2\sigma_\bar{X}]$ will be a confidence interval for $\mu$ with a confidence level of approximately 0.95. Its endpoints are the random variables $\bar{X}-2\sigma_\bar{X}$ and $\bar{X}+2\sigma_\bar{X}$, whose actual values will depend on the sample taken.

=== In general topology ===
Every Tychonoff space is embeddable into a product space of the closed unit intervals $[0,1].$ Actually, every Tychonoff space that has a base of cardinality $\kappa$ is embeddable into the product $[0,1]^\kappa$ of $\kappa$ copies of the intervals.

The concepts of convex sets and convex components are used in a proof that every totally ordered set endowed with the order topology is completely normal or moreover, monotonically normal.

== Generalizations ==
=== Balls ===
An open finite interval $(a, b)$ is a 1-dimensional open ball with a center at $\tfrac12(a + b)$ and a radius of $\tfrac12(b - a).$ The closed finite interval $[a, b]$ is the corresponding closed ball, and the interval's two endpoints $\{a, b\}$ form a 0-dimensional sphere. Generalized to $n$-dimensional Euclidean space, a ball is the set of points whose distance from the center is less than the radius. In the 2-dimensional case, a ball is called a disk.

If a half-space is taken as a kind of degenerate ball (without a well-defined center or radius), a half-space can be taken as analogous to a half-bounded interval, with its boundary plane as the (degenerate) sphere corresponding to the finite endpoint.

=== Multi-dimensional intervals ===
A finite interval is (the interior of) a 1-dimensional hyperrectangle. Generalized to real coordinate space $\R^n,$ an axis-aligned hyperrectangle (or box) is the Cartesian product of $n$ finite intervals. For $n=2$ this is a rectangle; for $n=3$ this is a rectangular cuboid (also called a "box").

Allowing for a mix of open, closed, and infinite endpoints, the Cartesian product of any $n$ intervals, $I = I_1\times I_2 \times \cdots \times I_n$ is sometimes called an $n$-dimensional interval.

A facet of such an interval $I$ is the result of replacing any non-degenerate interval factor $I_k$ by a degenerate interval consisting of a finite endpoint of $I_k.$ The faces of $I$ comprise $I$ itself and all faces of its facets. The corners of $I$ are the faces that consist of a single point of $\R^n.$

=== Convex polytopes ===
Any finite interval can be constructed as the intersection of half-bounded intervals (with an empty intersection taken to mean the whole real line), and the intersection of any number of half-bounded intervals is a (possibly empty) interval. Generalized to $n$-dimensional affine space, an intersection of half-spaces (of arbitrary orientation) is (the interior of) a convex polytope, or in the 2-dimensional case a convex polygon.

=== Domains ===
An open interval is a connected open set of real numbers. Generalized to topological spaces in general, a non-empty connected open set is called a domain.

=== Complex intervals ===
Intervals of complex numbers can be defined as regions of the complex plane, either rectangular or circular.

=== Intervals in posets and preordered sets ===
==== Definitions ====
The concept of intervals can be defined in arbitrary partially ordered sets or more generally, in arbitrary preordered sets. For a preordered set $(X,\lesssim)$ and two elements $a,b\in X,$ one similarly defines the intervals

$$(a,b)            =\{x\in X \mid a<x<b\},$$
$$[a,b]            =\{x\in X \mid a\lesssim x\lesssim b\},$$
$$(a,b]            =\{x\in X \mid a<x\lesssim b\},$$
$$[a,b)            =\{x\in X \mid a\lesssim x<b\},$$
$$(a,\infty)       =\{x\in X \mid a<x\},$$
$$[a,\infty)       =\{x\in X \mid a\lesssim x\},$$
$$(-\infty,b)      =\{x\in X \mid x<b\},$$
$$(-\infty,b]      =\{x\in X \mid x\lesssim b\},$$
$$(-\infty,\infty) =X,$$

where $x<y$ means $x\lesssim y\not\lesssim x.$ Actually, the intervals with single or no endpoints are the same as the intervals with two endpoints in the larger preordered set

$$\bar X=X\sqcup\{-\infty,\infty\}$$
$$-\infty<x<\infty\qquad(\forall x\in X)$$

defined by adding new smallest and greatest elements (even if there were ones), which are subsets of $X.$ In the case of $X=\mathbb R$ one may take $\bar\mathbb R$ to be the extended real line.

==== Convex sets and convex components in order theory ====
A subset $A\subseteq X$ of the preordered set $(X,\lesssim)$ is (order-)convex if for every $x,y\in A$ and every $x\lesssim z\lesssim y$ we have $z\in A.$ Unlike in the case of the real line, a convex set of a preordered set need not be an interval. For example, in the totally ordered set $(\mathbb Q,\le)$ of rational numbers, the set

$$\mathbb Q=\{x\in\mathbb Q \mid x^2<2\}$$

is convex, but not an interval of $\mathbb Q,$ since there is no square root of two in $\mathbb Q.$

Let $(X,\lesssim)$ be a preordered set and let $Y\subseteq X.$ The convex sets of $X$ contained in $Y$ form a poset under inclusion. A maximal element of this poset is called a convex component of $Y.$ By the Zorn lemma, any convex set of $X$ contained in $Y$ is contained in some convex component of $Y,$ but such components need not be unique. In a totally ordered set, such a component is always unique. That is, the convex components of a subset of a totally ordered set form a partition.

==== Properties ====
A generalization of the characterizations of the real intervals follows. For a non-empty subset $I$ of a linear continuum $(L,\le),$ the following conditions are equivalent.

- The set $I$ is an interval.
- The set $I$ is order-convex.
- The set $I$ is a connected subset when $L$ is endowed with the order topology.

For a subset $S$ of a lattice $L,$ the following conditions are equivalent.

- The set $S$ is a sublattice and an (order-)convex set.
- There is an ideal $I\subseteq L$ and a filter $F\subseteq L$ such that $S=I\cap F.$

== Topological algebra ==
Intervals can be associated with points of the plane, and hence regions of intervals can be associated with regions of the plane. Generally, an interval in mathematics corresponds to an ordered pair (x, y) taken from the direct product $\R \times \R$ of real numbers with itself, where it is often assumed that y > x. For purposes of mathematical structure, this restriction is discarded, and "reversed intervals" where y − x < 0 are allowed. Then, the collection of all intervals [x, y] can be identified with the topological ring formed by the direct sum of $\R$ with itself, where addition and multiplication are defined component-wise.

The direct sum algebra $( \R \oplus \R, +, \times)$ has two ideals, { [x,0] : x ∈ R } and { [0,y] : y ∈ R }. The identity element of this algebra is the condensed interval [1, 1]. If interval [x, y] is not in one of the ideals, then it has multiplicative inverse [1/x, 1/y]. Endowed with the usual topology, the algebra of intervals forms a topological ring. The group of units of this ring consists of four quadrants determined by the axes, or ideals in this case. The identity component of this group is quadrant I.

Every interval can be considered a symmetric interval around its midpoint. In a reconfiguration published in 1956 by M Warmus, the axis of "balanced intervals" [x, −x] is used along with the axis of intervals [x, x] that reduce to a point. Instead of the direct sum $R \oplus R,$ the ring of intervals has been identified with the hyperbolic numbers by M. Warmus and D. H. Lehmer through the identification

$$z = \tfrac12(x + y) + \tfrac12(x - y)j,$$

where $j^2 = 1.$

This linear mapping of the plane, which amounts of a ring isomorphism, provides the plane with a multiplicative structure having some analogies to ordinary complex arithmetic, such as polar decomposition.

== See also ==
- Arc (geometry)
- Inequality
- Interval graph
- Interval finite element
- Interval (statistics)
- Line segment
- Partition of an interval
- Unit interval

== Bibliography ==
- T. Sunaga, "Theory of interval algebra and its application to numerical analysis", In: Research Association of Applied Geometry (RAAG) Memoirs, Ggujutsu Bunken Fukuy-kai. Tokyo, Japan, 1958, Vol. 2, pp. 29–46 (547-564); reprinted in Japan Journal on Industrial and Applied Mathematics, 2009, Vol. 26, No. 2-3, pp. 126–143.
