= Bernstein set =

In mathematics, a Bernstein set is a subset of the real line that meets every uncountable closed subset of the real line but that contains none of them.

A Bernstein set partitions the real line into two pieces in a peculiar way: every measurable set of positive measure meets both the Bernstein set and its complement, as does every set with the property of Baire that is not a meagre set.
