= Isolated point =

Point of a subset S around which there are no other points of S

"0" is an isolated point of $A = \{0\} \cup [1, 2]$

In mathematics, a point x is called an isolated point of a subset S (in a topological space X) if x is an element of S and there exists a neighborhood of x that does not contain any other points of S. This is equivalent to saying that the singleton {x} is an open set in the topological space S (considered as a subspace of X). Another equivalent formulation is: an element x of S is an isolated point of S if and only if it is not a limit point of S.

If the space X is a metric space, for example a Euclidean space, then an element x of S is an isolated point of S if there exists an open ball around x that contains only finitely many elements of S. A point set that is made up only of isolated points is called a discrete set or discrete point set (see also discrete space), as opposed to a region (or a continuum).

== Related notions ==
Any discrete subset S of Euclidean space must be countable, since the isolation of each of its points together with the fact that rationals are dense in the reals means that the points of S may be mapped injectively onto a set of points with rational coordinates, of which there are only countably many. However, not every countable set is discrete, of which the rational numbers under the usual Euclidean metric are the canonical example.

A set with no isolated point is said to be dense-in-itself (every neighbourhood of a point contains other points of the set). A closed set with no isolated point is called a perfect set (it contains all its limit points and no isolated points).

The number of isolated points is a topological invariant, i.e. if two topological spaces X, Y are homeomorphic, the number of isolated points in each is equal.

== Examples ==
=== Standard examples ===
Topological spaces in the following three examples are considered as subspaces of the real line with the standard topology.

- For the set $S=\{0\}\cup [1, 2],$ the point 0 is an isolated point.
- For the set $S=\{0\}\cup \{1, \tfrac 1 2, \tfrac 1 3, \dots \},$ each of the points $\tfrac 1 k$ is an isolated point, but 0 is not an isolated point because there are other points in S as close to 0 as desired.
- The set $\N = \{0, 1, 2, \ldots \}$ of natural numbers is a discrete set.

In the topological space $X=\{a,b\}$ with topology $\tau=\{\emptyset,\{a\},X\},$ the element a is an isolated point, even though $b$ belongs to the closure of $\{a\}$ (and is therefore, in some sense, "close" to a). Such a situation is not possible in a Hausdorff space.

The Morse lemma states that non-degenerate critical points of certain functions are isolated.

=== Two counter-intuitive examples ===
Consider the set F of points x in the real interval (0,1) such that every digit x_{i} of their binary representation fulfills the following conditions:

- Either $x_i=0$ or $x_i=1.$
- $x_i=1$ only for finitely many indices i.
- If m denotes the largest index such that $x_m=1,$ then $x_{m-1}=0.$
- If $x_i=1$ and $i < m,$ then exactly one of the following two conditions holds: $x_{i-1}=1$ or $x_{i+1}=1.$

Informally, these conditions means that every digit of the binary representation of $x$ that equals 1 belongs to a pair ...0110..., except for ...010... at the very end.

Now, F is an explicit set consisting entirely of isolated points but has the counter-intuitive property that its closure is an uncountable set.

Another set F with the same properties can be obtained as follows. Let C be the middle-thirds Cantor set, let $I_1,I_2,I_3,\ldots,I_k,\ldots$ be the component intervals of $[0,1]-C$, and let F be a set consisting of one point from each I_{k}. Since each I_{k} contains only one point from F, every point of F is an isolated point. However, if p is any point in the Cantor set, then every neighborhood of p contains at least one I_{k}, and hence at least one point of F. It follows that each point of the Cantor set lies in the closure of F, and therefore F has uncountable closure.

== See also ==
- Acnode
- Adherent point
- Accumulation point
- Point cloud
