= Closure (topology) =

All points and limit points in a subset of a topological space

In topology, the closure of a subset S of points in a topological space consists of all points in S together with all limit points of S. The closure of S may equivalently be defined as the union of S and its boundary, and also as the intersection of all closed sets containing S. Intuitively, the closure can be thought of as all the points that are either in S or "very near" S. A point which is in the closure of S is a point of closure of S. The notion of closure is in many ways dual to the notion of interior.

== Definitions ==
=== Point of closure ===
For $S$ as a subset of a Euclidean space, $x$ is a point of closure of $S$ if every open ball centered at $x$ contains a point of $S$ (this point can be $x$ itself).

This definition generalizes to any subset $S$ of a metric space $X.$ Fully expressed, for $X$ as a metric space with metric $d,$ $x$ is a point of closure of $S$ if for every $r > 0$ there exists some $s \in S$ such that the distance $d(x, s) < r$ ($x = s$ is allowed). Another way to express this is to say that $x$ is a point of closure of $S$ if the distance $d(x, S) := \inf_{s \in S} d(x, s) = 0$ where $\inf$ is the infimum.

This definition generalizes to topological spaces by replacing "open ball" or "ball" with "neighbourhood". Let $S$ be a subset of a topological space $X.$ Then $x$ is a point of closure or adherent point of $S$ if every neighbourhood of $x$ contains a point of $S$ (again, $x = s$ for $s \in S$ is allowed). Note that this definition does not depend upon whether neighbourhoods are required to be open.

=== Limit point ===
The definition of a point of closure of a set is closely related to the definition of a limit point of a set. The difference between the two definitions is subtle but important – namely, in the definition of a limit point $x$ of a set $S$, every neighbourhood of $x$ must contain a point of $S$ other than $x$ itself, i.e., each neighbourhood of $x$ obviously has $x$, but it also must have a point of $S$ that is not equal to $x$ in order for $x$ to be a limit point of $S$. A limit point of $S$ has more strict condition than a point of closure of $S$ in the definitions. The set of all limit points of a set $S$ is called the derived set of $S$. A limit point of a set is also called cluster point or accumulation point of the set.

Thus, every limit point is a point of closure, but not every point of closure is a limit point. A point of closure which is not a limit point is an isolated point. In other words, a point $x$ is an isolated point of $S$ if it is an element of $S$ and there is a neighbourhood of $x$ which contains no other points of $S$ than $x$ itself.

For a given set $S$ and point $x,$ $x$ is a point of closure of $S$ if and only if $x$ is an element of $S$ or $x$ is a limit point of $S$ (or both).

=== Closure of a set ===
The closure of a subset $S$ of a topological space $(X, \tau),$ denoted by $\operatorname{cl}_{(X, \tau)} S$ or possibly by $\operatorname{cl}_X S$ (if $\tau$ is understood), where if both $X$ and $\tau$ are clear from context then it may also be denoted by $\operatorname{cl} S,$ $\overline{S},$ or $S {}^{-}$ (Moreover, $\operatorname{cl}$ is sometimes capitalized to $\operatorname{Cl}$.) can be defined using any of the following equivalent definitions:

1. $\operatorname{cl} S$ is the set of all points of closure of $S.$
2. $\operatorname{cl} S$ is the set $S$ together with all of its limit points. (Each point of $S$ is a point of closure of $S$, and each limit point of $S$ is also a point of closure of $S$.)
3. $\operatorname{cl} S$ is the intersection of all closed sets containing $S.$
4. $\operatorname{cl} S$ is the smallest closed set containing $S.$
5. $\operatorname{cl} S$ is the union of $S$ and its boundary $\partial(S).$
6. $\operatorname{cl} S$ is the set of all $x \in X$ for which there exists a net (valued) in $S$ that converges to $x$ in $(X, \tau).$

The closure of a set has the following properties.

- $\operatorname{cl} S$ is a closed superset of $S$.
- The set $S$ is closed if and only if $S = \operatorname{cl} S$.
- If $S \subseteq T$ then $\operatorname{cl} S$ is a subset of $\operatorname{cl} T.$
- If $A$ is a closed set, then $A$ contains $S$ if and only if $A$ contains $\operatorname{cl} S.$

Sometimes the second or third property above is taken as the definition of the topological closure, which still make sense when applied to other types of closures (see below).

In a first-countable space (such as a metric space), $\operatorname{cl} S$ is the set of all limits of all convergent sequences of points in $S.$ For a general topological space, this statement remains true if one replaces "sequence" by "net" or "filter" (as described in the article on filters in topology).

Note that these properties are also satisfied if "closure", "superset", "intersection", "contains/containing", "smallest" and "closed" are replaced by "interior", "subset", "union", "contained in", "largest", and "open". For more on this matter, see closure operator below.

== Examples ==
Consider a sphere in a 3 dimensional space. Implicitly there are two regions of interest created by this sphere; the sphere itself and its interior (which is called an open 3-ball). It is useful to distinguish between the interior and the surface of the sphere, so we distinguish between the open 3-ball (the interior of the sphere), and the closed 3-ball – the closure of the open 3-ball that is the open 3-ball plus the surface (the surface as the sphere itself).

In topological space:

- In any space, $\varnothing = \operatorname{cl} \varnothing$. In other words, the closure of the empty set $\varnothing$ is $\varnothing$ itself.
- In any space $X,$ $X = \operatorname{cl} X.$

Giving $\mathbb{R}$ and $\mathbb{C}$ the standard (metric) topology:

- If $X$ is the Euclidean space $\mathbb{R}$ of real numbers, then $\operatorname{cl}_X ((0, 1)) = [0, 1]$. In other words., the closure of the set $(0,1)$ as a subset of $X$ is $[0,1]$.
- If $X$ is the Euclidean space $\mathbb{R}$, then the closure of the set $\mathbb{Q}$ of rational numbers is the whole space $\mathbb{R}.$ We say that $\mathbb{Q}$ is dense in $\mathbb{R}.$
- If $X$ is the complex plane $\mathbb{C} = \mathbb{R}^2,$ then $\operatorname{cl}_X \left( \{ z \in \mathbb{C} : | z | > 1 \} \right) = \{ z \in \mathbb{C} : | z | \geq 1 \}.$
- If $S$ is a finite subset of a Euclidean space $X,$ then $\operatorname{cl}_X S = S.$ (For a general topological space, this property is equivalent to the T_{1} axiom.)

On the set of real numbers one can put other topologies rather than the standard one.

- If $X = \mathbb{R}$ is endowed with the lower limit topology, then $\operatorname{cl}_X ((0, 1)) = [0, 1).$
- If one considers on $X = \mathbb{R}$ the discrete topology in which every set is closed (open), then $\operatorname{cl}_X ((0, 1)) = (0, 1).$
- If one considers on $X = \mathbb{R}$ the trivial topology in which the only closed (open) sets are the empty set and $\mathbb{R}$ itself, then $\operatorname{cl}_X ((0, 1)) = \mathbb{R}.$

These examples show that the closure of a set depends upon the topology of the underlying space. The last two examples are special cases of the following.

- In any discrete space, since every set is closed (and also open), every set is equal to its closure.
- In any indiscrete space $X,$ since the only closed sets are the empty set and $X$ itself, we have that the closure of the empty set is the empty set, and for every non-empty subset $A$ of $X,$ $\operatorname{cl}_X A = X.$ In other words, every non-empty subset of an indiscrete space is dense.

The closure of a set also depends upon in which space we are taking the closure. For example, if $X$ is the set of rational numbers, with the usual relative topology induced by the Euclidean space $\mathbb{R},$ and if $S = \{ q \in \mathbb{Q} : q^2 > 2, q > 0 \},$ then $S$ is both closed and open in $\mathbb{Q}$ because neither $S$ nor its complement can contain $\sqrt2$, which would be the lower bound of $S$, but cannot be in $S$ because $\sqrt2$ is irrational. So, $S$ has no well defined closure due to boundary elements not being in $\mathbb{Q}$. However, if we instead define $X$ to be the set of real numbers and define the interval in the same way then the closure of that interval is well defined and would be the set of all real numbers greater than or equal to $\sqrt2$.

== Closure operator ==
A closure operator on a set $X$ is a mapping of the power set of $X,$ $\mathcal{P}(X)$, into itself which satisfies the Kuratowski closure axioms. Given a topological space $(X, \tau)$, the topological closure induces a function $\operatorname{cl}_X : \wp(X) \to \wp(X)$ that is defined by sending a subset $S \subseteq X$ to $\operatorname{cl}_X S,$ where the notation $\overline{S}$ or $S^{-}$ may be used instead. Conversely, if $\mathbb{c}$ is a closure operator on a set $X,$ then a topological space is obtained by defining the closed sets as being exactly those subsets $S \subseteq X$ that satisfy $\mathbb{c}(S) = S$ (so complements in $X$ of these subsets form the open sets of the topology).

The closure operator $\operatorname{cl}_X$ is dual to the interior operator, which is denoted by $\operatorname{int}_X,$ in the sense that
$$\operatorname{cl}_X S = X \setminus \operatorname{int}_X (X \setminus S),$$
and also
$$\operatorname{int}_X S = X \setminus \operatorname{cl}_X (X \setminus S).$$

Therefore, the abstract theory of closure operators and the Kuratowski closure axioms can be readily translated into the language of interior operators by replacing sets with their complements in $X.$

In general, the closure operator does not commute with intersections. However, in a complete metric space the following result does hold:

Theorem (C. Ursescu)—Let $S_1, S_2, \ldots$ be a sequence of subsets of a complete metric space $X.$

- If each $S_i$ is closed in $X$ then
  $$\operatorname{cl}_X \left( \bigcup_{i \in \N} \operatorname{int}_X S_i \right) = \operatorname{cl}_X \left[ \operatorname{int}_X \left( \bigcup_{i \in \N} S_i \right) \right].$$
- If each $S_i$ is open in $X$ then
  $$\operatorname{int}_X \left( \bigcap_{i \in \N} \operatorname{cl}_X S_i \right) = \operatorname{int}_X \left[ \operatorname{cl}_X \left( \bigcap_{i \in \N} S_i \right) \right].$$

== Properties ==
A subset $S$ is closed in $X$ if and only if $\operatorname{cl}_X S = S.$ In particular:

- The closure of the empty set is the empty set;
- The closure of $X$ itself is $X.$
- The closure of an intersection of sets is always a subset of (but need not be equal to) the intersection of the closures of the sets.
- In a union of finitely many sets, the closure of the union and the union of the closures are equal; the union of zero sets is the empty set, and so this statement contains the earlier statement about the closure of the empty set as a special case.
- The closure of the union of infinitely many sets need not equal the union of the closures, but it is always a superset of the union of the closures.
  - Thus, just as the union of two closed sets is closed, so too does closure distribute over binary unions: that is, $\operatorname{cl}_X (S \cup T) = (\operatorname{cl}_X S) \cup (\operatorname{cl}_X T).$ But just as a union of infinitely many closed sets is not necessarily closed, so too does closure not necessarily distribute over infinite unions: that is, $\operatorname{cl}_X \left(\bigcup_{i \in I} S_i\right) \neq \bigcup_{i \in I} \operatorname{cl}_X S_i$ is possible when $I$ is infinite.

If $S \subseteq T \subseteq X$ and if $T$ is a subspace of $X$ (meaning that $T$ is endowed with the subspace topology that $X$ induces on it), then $\operatorname{cl}_T S \subseteq \operatorname{cl}_X S$ and the closure of $S$ computed in $T$ is equal to the intersection of $T$ and the closure of $S$ computed in $X$:
$$\operatorname{cl}_T S ~=~ T \cap \operatorname{cl}_X S.$$

Proof

Because $\operatorname{cl}_X S$ is a closed subset of $X,$ the intersection $T \cap \operatorname{cl}_X S$ is a closed subset of $T$ (by definition of the subspace topology), which implies that $\operatorname{cl}_T S \subseteq T \cap \operatorname{cl}_X S$ (because $\operatorname{cl}_T S$ is the smallest closed subset of $T$ containing $S$). Because $\operatorname{cl}_T S$ is a closed subset of $T,$ from the definition of the subspace topology, there must exist some set $C \subseteq X$ such that $C$ is closed in $X$ and $\operatorname{cl}_T S = T \cap C.$ Because $S \subseteq \operatorname{cl}_T S \subseteq C$ and $C$ is closed in $X,$ the minimality of $\operatorname{cl}_X S$ implies that $\operatorname{cl}_X S \subseteq C.$ Intersecting both sides with $T$ shows that $T \cap \operatorname{cl}_X S \subseteq T \cap C = \operatorname{cl}_T S.$ $\blacksquare$

It follows that $S \subseteq T$ is a dense subset of $T$ if and only if $T$ is a subset of $\operatorname{cl}_X S.$ It is possible for $\operatorname{cl}_T S = T \cap \operatorname{cl}_X S$ to be a proper subset of $\operatorname{cl}_X S;$ for example, take $X = \R,$ $S = (0, 1),$ and $T = (0, \infty).$

If $S, T \subseteq X$ but $S$ is not necessarily a subset of $T$ then only
$$\operatorname{cl}_T (S \cap T) ~\subseteq~ T \cap \operatorname{cl}_X S$$
is always guaranteed, where this containment could be strict (consider for instance $X = \R$ with the usual topology, $T = (-\infty, 0],$ and $S = (0, \infty)$ (Note: From $T := (-\infty, 0]$ and $S := (0, \infty)$ it follows that $S \cap T = \varnothing$ and $\operatorname{cl}_X S = [0, \infty),$ which implies $$\varnothing ~=~ \operatorname{cl}_T (S \cap T) ~\neq~ T \cap \operatorname{cl}_X S ~=~ \{0\}.$$)), although if $T$ happens to an open subset of $X$ then the equality $\operatorname{cl}_T (S \cap T) = T \cap \operatorname{cl}_X S$ will hold (no matter the relationship between $S$ and $T$).

Proof

Let $S, T \subseteq X$ and assume that $T$ is open in $X.$ Let $C := \operatorname{cl}_T (T \cap S),$ which is equal to $T \cap \operatorname{cl}_X (T \cap S)$ (because $T \cap S \subseteq T \subseteq X$). The complement $T \setminus C$ is open in $T,$ where $T$ being open in $X$ now implies that $T \setminus C$ is also open in $X.$ Consequently $X \setminus (T \setminus C) = (X \setminus T) \cup C$ is a closed subset of $X$ where $(X \setminus T) \cup C$ contains $S$ as a subset (because if $s \in S$ is in $T$ then $s \in T \cap S \subseteq \operatorname{cl}_T (T \cap S) = C$), which implies that $\operatorname{cl}_X S \subseteq (X \setminus T) \cup C.$ Intersecting both sides with $T$ proves that $T \cap \operatorname{cl}_X S \subseteq T \cap C = C.$ The reverse inclusion follows from $C \subseteq \operatorname{cl}_X (T \cap S) \subseteq \operatorname{cl}_X S.$ $\blacksquare$

Consequently, if $\mathcal{U}$ is any open cover of $X$ and if $S \subseteq X$ is any subset then:
$$\operatorname{cl}_X S = \bigcup_{U \in \mathcal{U}} \operatorname{cl}_U (U \cap S)$$
because $\operatorname{cl}_U (S \cap U) = U \cap \operatorname{cl}_X S$ for every $U \in \mathcal{U}$ (where every $U \in \mathcal{U}$ is endowed with the subspace topology induced on it by $X$). This equality is particularly useful when $X$ is a manifold and the sets in the open cover $\mathcal{U}$ are domains of coordinate charts. In words, this result shows that the closure in $X$ of any subset $S \subseteq X$ can be computed "locally" in the sets of any open cover of $X$ and then unioned together. In this way, this result can be viewed as the analogue of the well-known fact that a subset $S \subseteq X$ is closed in $X$ if and only if it is "locally closed in $X$", meaning that if $\mathcal{U}$ is any open cover of $X$ then $S$ is closed in $X$ if and only if $S \cap U$ is closed in $U$ for every $U \in \mathcal{U}.$

== Functions and closure ==
=== Continuity ===
A function $f : X \to Y$ between topological spaces is continuous if and only if the preimage of every closed subset of the codomain is closed in the domain; explicitly, this means: $f^{-1}(C)$ is closed in $X$ whenever $C$ is a closed subset of $Y.$

In terms of the closure operator, $f : X \to Y$ is continuous if and only if for every subset $A \subseteq X,$
$$f\left(\operatorname{cl}_X A\right) ~\subseteq~ \operatorname{cl}_Y (f(A)).$$
That is to say, given any element $x \in X$ that belongs to the closure of a subset $A \subseteq X,$ $f(x)$ necessarily belongs to the closure of $f(A)$ in $Y.$ If we declare that a point $x$ is close to a subset $A \subseteq X$ if $x \in \operatorname{cl}_X A,$ then this terminology allows for a plain English description of continuity: $f$ is continuous if and only if for every subset $A \subseteq X,$ $f$ maps points that are close to $A$ to points that are close to $f(A).$ Thus continuous functions are exactly those functions that preserve (in the forward direction) the "closeness" relationship between points and sets: a function is continuous if and only if whenever a point is close to a set then the image of that point is close to the image of that set. Similarly, $f$ is continuous at a fixed given point $x \in X$ if and only if whenever $x$ is close to a subset $A \subseteq X,$ then $f(x)$ is close to $f(A).$

=== Closed maps ===
A function $f : X \to Y$ is a (strongly) closed map if and only if whenever $C$ is a closed subset of $X$ then $f(C)$ is a closed subset of $Y.$ In terms of the closure operator, $f : X \to Y$ is a (strongly) closed map if and only if $\operatorname{cl}_Y f(A) \subseteq f\left(\operatorname{cl}_X A\right)$ for every subset $A \subseteq X.$ Equivalently, $f : X \to Y$ is a (strongly) closed map if and only if $\operatorname{cl}_Y f(C) \subseteq f(C)$ for every closed subset $C \subseteq X.$

== Categorical interpretation ==
One may define the closure operator in terms of universal arrows, as follows.

The powerset of a set $X$ may be realized as a partial order category $P$ in which the objects are subsets and the morphisms are inclusion maps $A \to B$ whenever $A$ is a subset of $B.$ Furthermore, a topology $T$ on $X$ is a subcategory of $P$ with inclusion functor $I : T \to P.$ The set of closed subsets containing a fixed subset $A \subseteq X$ can be identified with the comma category $(A \downarrow I).$ This category — also a partial order — then has initial object $\operatorname{cl} A.$ Thus there is a universal arrow from $A$ to $I,$ given by the inclusion $A \to \operatorname{cl} A.$

Similarly, since every closed set containing $X \setminus A$ corresponds with an open set contained in $A$ we can interpret the category $(I \downarrow X \setminus A)$ as the set of open subsets contained in $A,$ with terminal object $\operatorname{int}(A),$ the interior of $A.$

All properties of the closure can be derived from this definition and a few properties of the above categories. Moreover, this definition makes precise the analogy between the topological closure and other types of closures (for example algebraic closure), since all are examples of universal arrows.

== See also ==
- Adherent point – Point that belongs to the closure of some given subset of a topological space
- Closure algebra – Algebraic structure
- Closed regular set, a set equal to the closure of their interior
- Derived set (mathematics) – Set of all limit points of a set
- Interior (topology) – Largest open subset of some given set
- Limit point of a set – Cluster point in a topological space

== Bibliography ==
- Baker, Crump W. (1991), Introduction to Topology, Wm. C. Brown Publisher, ISBN 0-697-05972-3
- Croom, Fred H. (1989), Principles of Topology, Saunders College Publishing, ISBN 0-03-012813-7
- Gemignani, Michael C. (1990) [1967], Elementary Topology (2nd ed.), Dover, ISBN 0-486-66522-4
- Hocking, John G.; Young, Gail S. (1988) [1961], Topology, Dover, ISBN 0-486-65676-4
- Kuratowski, K. (1966), Topology, vol. I, Academic Press
- Pervin, William J. (1965), Foundations of General Topology, Academic Press
- Schubert, Horst (1968), Topology, Allyn and Bacon
- Zălinescu, Constantin (30 July 2002). Convex Analysis in General Vector Spaces. River Edge, N.J. London: World Scientific Publishing. ISBN 978-981-4488-15-0. MR 1921556. OCLC 285163112 – via Internet Archive.
