= Monotonically normal space =

Property of topological spaces stronger than normality

In mathematics, specifically in the field of topology, a monotonically normal space is a particular kind of normal space, defined in terms of a monotone normality operator. It satisfies some interesting properties; for example metric spaces and linearly ordered spaces are monotonically normal, and every monotonically normal space is hereditarily normal.

== Definition ==
A topological space $X$ is called monotonically normal if it satisfies any of the following equivalent definitions:

=== Definition 1 ===
The space $X$ is T_{1} and there is a function $G$ that assigns to each ordered pair $(A,B)$ of disjoint closed sets in $X$ an open set $G(A,B)$ such that:

(i) $A\subseteq G(A,B)\subseteq \overline{G(A,B)}\subseteq X\setminus B$;
(ii) $G(A,B)\subseteq G(A',B')$ whenever $A\subseteq A'$ and $B'\subseteq B$.

Condition (i) says $X$ is a normal space, as witnessed by the function $G$. Condition (ii) says that $G(A,B)$ varies in a monotone fashion, hence the terminology monotonically normal. The operator $G$ is called a monotone normality operator.

One can always choose $G$ to satisfy the property

$$G(A,B)\cap G(B,A)=\emptyset$$,

by replacing each $G(A,B)$ by $G(A,B)\setminus\overline{G(B,A)}$.

=== Definition 2 ===
The space $X$ is T_{1} and there is a function $G$ that assigns to each ordered pair $(A,B)$ of separated sets in $X$ (that is, such that $A\cap\overline{B}=B\cap\overline{A}=\emptyset$) an open set $G(A,B)$ satisfying the same conditions (i) and (ii) of Definition 1.

=== Definition 3 ===
The space $X$ is T_{1} and there is a function $\mu$ that assigns to each pair $(x,U)$ with $U$ open in $X$ and $x\in U$ an open set $\mu(x,U)$ such that:

(i) $x\in\mu(x,U)$;
(ii) if $\mu(x,U)\cap\mu(y,V)\ne\emptyset$, then $x\in V$ or $y\in U$.

Such a function $\mu$ automatically satisfies

$$x\in\mu(x,U)\subseteq\overline{\mu(x,U)}\subseteq U$$.

(Reason: Suppose $y\in X\setminus U$. Since $X$ is T_{1}, there is an open neighborhood $V$ of $y$ such that $x\notin V$. By condition (ii), $\mu(x,U)\cap\mu(y,V)=\emptyset$, that is, $\mu(y,V)$ is a neighborhood of $y$ disjoint from $\mu(x,U)$. So $y\notin\overline{\mu(x,U)}$.)

=== Definition 4 ===
Let $\mathcal{B}$ be a base for the topology of $X$. The space $X$ is T_{1} and there is a function $\mu$ that assigns to each pair $(x,U)$ with $U\in\mathcal{B}$ and $x\in U$ an open set $\mu(x,U)$ satisfying the same conditions (i) and (ii) of Definition 3.

=== Definition 5 ===
The space $X$ is T_{1} and there is a function $\mu$ that assigns to each pair $(x,U)$ with $U$ open in $X$ and $x\in U$ an open set $\mu(x,U)$ such that:

(i) $x\in\mu(x,U)$;
(ii) if $U$ and $V$ are open and $x\in U\subseteq V$, then $\mu(x,U)\subseteq\mu(x,V)$;
(iii) if $x$ and $y$ are distinct points, then $\mu(x,X\setminus\{y\})\cap\mu(y,X\setminus\{x\})=\emptyset$.

Such a function $\mu$ automatically satisfies all conditions of Definition 3.

== Examples ==
- Every metrizable space is monotonically normal.
- Every linearly ordered topological space (LOTS) is monotonically normal. This is assuming the Axiom of Choice, as without it there are examples of LOTS that are not even normal.
- The Sorgenfrey line is monotonically normal. This follows from Definition 4 by taking as a base for the topology all intervals of the form $[a,b)$ and for $x\in[a,b)$ by letting $\mu(x,[a,b))=[x,b)$. Alternatively, the Sorgenfrey line is monotonically normal because it can be embedded as a subspace of a LOTS, namely the double arrow space.
- Any generalised metric is monotonically normal.

== Properties ==
- Monotone normality is a hereditary property: Every subspace of a monotonically normal space is monotonically normal.
- Every monotonically normal space is completely normal Hausdorff (or T_{5}).
- Every monotonically normal space is hereditarily collectionwise normal.
- The image of a monotonically normal space under a continuous closed map is monotonically normal.
- A compact Hausdorff space $X$ is the continuous image of a compact linearly ordered space if and only if $X$ is monotonically normal.
