= Neighbourhood (mathematics) =

Open set containing a given point

A set $V$ in the plane is a neighbourhood of a point $p$ if a small disc around $p$ is contained in $V.$ The small disc around $p$ is an open set $U.$

In topology and mathematical analysis, a neighbourhood (or neighborhood) is one of the basic concepts in a topological space. It is closely related to the concepts of open set and interior. Intuitively speaking, a neighbourhood of a point is a set of points containing that point where one can move some amount in any direction away from that point without leaving the set.

== Definitions ==
=== Neighbourhood of a point ===
If $X$ is a topological space and $p$ is a point in $X,$ then a neighbourhood of $p$ is a subset $V$ of $X$ that includes an open set $U$ containing $p$, (Note: By this definition, even a union of disjoint sets where one of these sets is an open set containing $p$, is a neighbourhood of $p$.)
$$p \in U \subseteq V \subseteq X.$$

This is equivalent to the point $p \in X$ belonging to the topological interior of $V$ in $X.$

The neighbourhood $V$ need not be an open subset of $X.$ When $V$ is open (resp. closed, compact, etc.) in $X,$ it is called an open neighbourhood (resp. closed neighbourhood, compact neighbourhood, etc.). Some authors require neighbourhoods to be open.

A closed rectangle V is not a neighbourhood of any of its corners or its boundary since there is no open set in V containing any corner or edge point.

A set that is a neighbourhood of each of its points is open since it can be expressed as the union of open sets containing each of its points. A closed rectangle, as illustrated in the figure, is not a neighbourhood of all its points; points on the edges or corners of the rectangle are not contained in any open set that is contained within the rectangle.

The collection of all neighbourhoods of a point is called the neighbourhood system at the point.

=== Neighbourhood of a set ===
If $S$ is a subset of a topological space $X$, then a neighbourhood of $S$ is a set $V$ that includes an open set $U$ containing $S$,
$$S \subseteq U \subseteq V \subseteq X.$$
It follows that a set $V$ is a neighbourhood of $S$ if and only if it is a neighbourhood of all the points in $S.$ Furthermore, $V$ is a neighbourhood of $S$ if and only if $S$ is a subset of the interior of $V.$ A neighbourhood of $S$ that is also an open subset of $X$ is called an open neighbourhood of $S.$ The neighbourhood of a point is just a special case of this definition.

== In a metric space ==
A set $S$ in the plane and a uniform neighbourhood $V$ of $S$. The open set that is depicted with the dashed line and contains $S$ is $S_r$, the r-neighbourhood of $S$.

The epsilon (ε) neighbourhood of a number $a$ on the real number line.

In a metric space $M = (X, d),$ a set $V$ is a neighbourhood of a point $p$ if there exists a positive real number $r$ such that the open ball
$$B(p; r) = \{ x \in X : d(x, p) < r \}$$
with center $p$ and radius $r$ is contained in $V.$

$V$ is a neighbourhood of a set $S$ if, for each element $p$ of $S,$ there exists a positive number $r$ such that $B(p; r)$ is contained in $V.$ $V$ is called a uniform neighbourhood of a set $S$ if there exists a positive number $r$ such that for all elements $p$ of $S,$ the open ball $B(p; r)$ is contained in $V.$

Under the same condition of the uniform neighbourhood with $r > 0,$ the $r$-neighbourhood $S_r$ of a set $S$ is the union of all the open balls of radius $r$ that are centered at each point in $S$:
$$S_r = \bigcup\limits_{p\in{}S} B_r(p).$$

It directly follows that an $r$-neighbourhood is a uniform neighbourhood, and that a set is a uniform neighbourhood if and only if it contains an $r$-neighbourhood for some value of $r.$

== Examples ==
The set M is a neighbourhood of the number a, because there is an ε-neighbourhood of a which is a subset of M.

Given the set of real numbers $\R$ with the usual Euclidean metric, the subset $V$ defined as
$$V := \bigcup_{n \in \N} B\left(n\,;\,1/n \right),$$
is a neighbourhood for the set $\N$ of natural numbers, but is not a uniform neighbourhood of this set because for every positive real number $r$, $B\left(\left\lceil \frac{1}{r} \right\rceil + 1\,;\,r\right)$ is not a subset of $V$ (note that $\left\lceil \frac{1}{r} \right\rceil + 1$ is a natural number).

== Topology from neighbourhoods ==
The above definition is useful if the notion of open set is already defined. There is an alternative way to define a topology, by first defining the neighbourhood system, and then open sets as those sets containing a neighbourhood of each of their points.

A neighbourhood system on $X$ is the assignment of a filter $N(x)$ of subsets of $X$ to each $x$ in $X,$ such that

1. the point $x$ is an element of each $U$ in $N(x)$
2. each $U$ in $N(x)$ contains some $V$ in $N(x)$ such that for each $y$ in $V,$ $U$ is in $N(y).$

One can show that both definitions are compatible, that is, the topology obtained from the neighbourhood system defined using open sets is the original one, and vice versa when starting out from a neighbourhood system.

== Uniform neighbourhoods ==
In a uniform space $S = (X, \Phi),$ $V$ is called a uniform neighbourhood of $P$ if there exists an entourage $U \in \Phi$ such that $V$ contains all points of $X$ that are $U$-close to some point of $P;$ that is, $U[x] \subseteq V$ for all $x \in P.$

== Deleted neighbourhood ==
A deleted neighbourhood of a point $p$ (sometimes called a punctured neighbourhood) is a neighbourhood of $p,$ without $\{p\}.$ For instance, the interval $(-1, 1) = \{y : -1 < y < 1\}$ is a neighbourhood of $p = 0$ in the real line, so the set $(-1, 0) \cup (0, 1) = (-1, 1) \setminus \{0\}$ is a deleted neighbourhood of $0.$ A deleted neighbourhood of a given point is not in fact a neighbourhood of the point. The concept of deleted neighbourhood occurs in the definition of the limit of a function and in the definition of limit points (among other things).

== See also ==
- Isolated point – Point of a subset S around which there are no other points of S
- Neighbourhood system – Concept in mathematics
- Region (mathematics) – Connected open subset of a topological space
- Tubular neighbourhood – Neighborhood of a submanifold
