= Cantor set =

Set of points on a line segment with certain topological properties

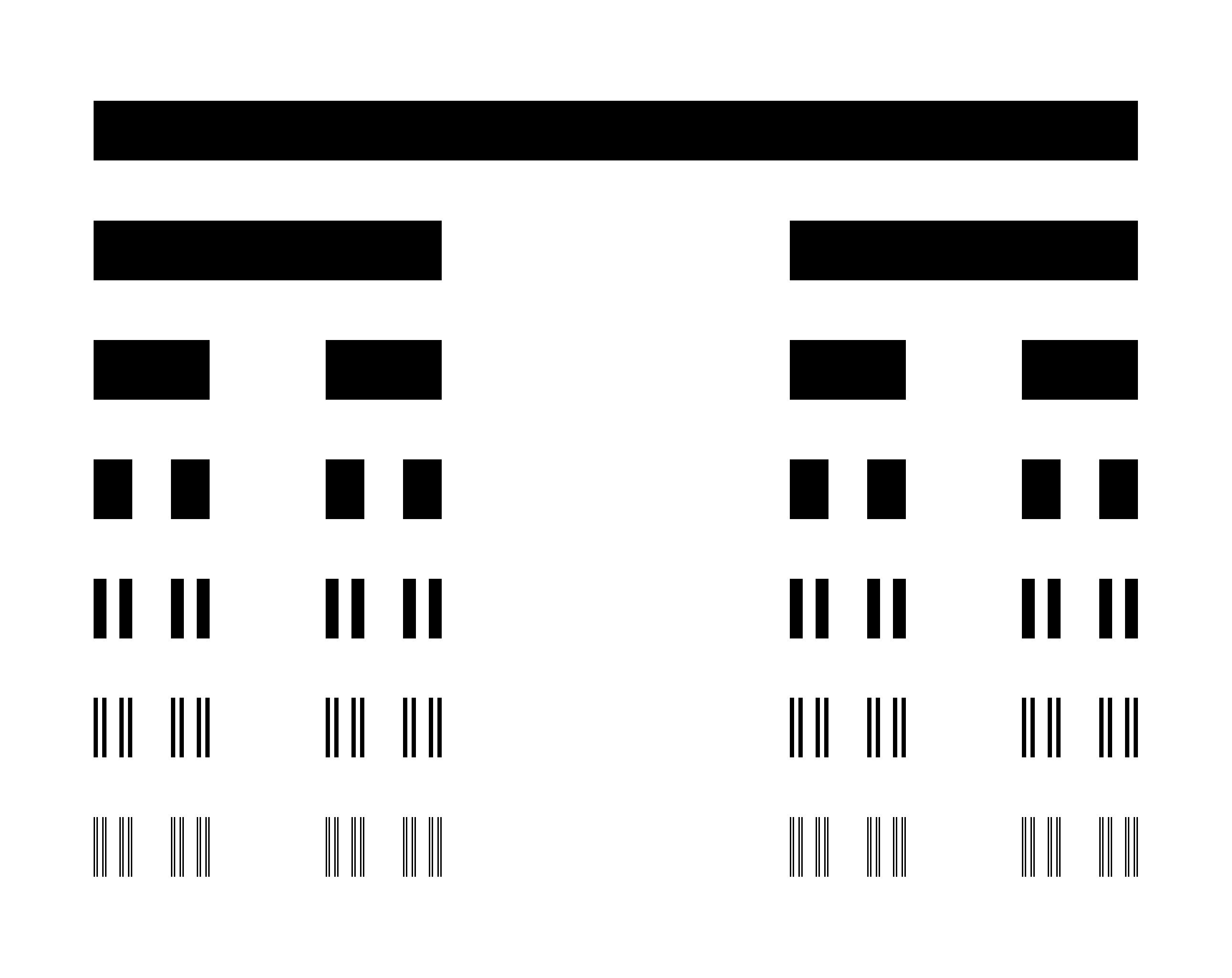
Seven iterations of the Cantor set's construction.

In mathematics, the Cantor set is a self-similar set of points lying on a single line segment that has a number of unintuitive properties. It was discovered in 1874 by Henry John Stephen Smith and mentioned by German mathematician Georg Cantor in 1883. As it contrasts with a linear continuum, the Cantor set has been called the Cantor discontinuum.

Through consideration of this set, Cantor and others helped lay the foundations of modern point-set topology. The most common construction is the Cantor ternary set, built by removing the middle third of a line segment and then repeating the process with the remaining shorter segments. Cantor mentioned this ternary construction only in passing, as an example of a perfect set that is nowhere dense.

More generally, in topology, a Cantor space is a topological space homeomorphic to the Cantor ternary set (equipped with its subspace topology). The Cantor set is naturally homeomorphic to the countable product ${\underline 2}^{\N}$ of the discrete two-point space $\underline 2$. By a theorem of L. E. J. Brouwer, this is equivalent to being perfect, nonempty, compact, metrizable and zero-dimensional.

Expansion of a Cantor set. Each point in the set is represented here by a vertical line.

== Construction and formula of the ternary set ==
The Cantor ternary set $\mathcal{C}$ is created by iteratively deleting the open middle third from a set of line segments. One starts by deleting the open middle third $\left(\frac{1}{3}, \frac{2}{3}\right)$ from the interval $\textstyle\left[0, 1\right]$, leaving two line segments: $\left[0, \frac{1}{3}\right]\cup\left[\frac{2}{3}, 1\right]$. Next, the open middle third of each of these remaining segments is deleted, leaving four line segments: $\left[0, \frac{1}{9}\right]\cup\left[\frac{2}{9}, \frac{1}{3}\right]\cup\left[\frac{2}{3}, \frac{7}{9}\right]\cup\left[\frac{8}{9}, 1\right]$. The Cantor ternary set contains all points in the interval $[0,1]$ that are not deleted at any step in this infinite process. The same construction can be described recursively by setting

$$C_0 := [0,1]$$

and

$$C_n := \frac{C_{n-1}} 3 \cup \left(\frac 2 {3} +\frac{C_{n-1}} 3 \right) = \frac13 \bigl(C_{n-1} \cup \left(2 + C_{n-1} \right)\bigr)$$

for $n \ge 1$, so that

$\mathcal{C} := \lim_{n\to\infty}C_n = \bigcap_{n=0}^\infty C_n = \bigcap_{n=m}^\infty C_n$ for any $m \ge 0$.

The first six steps of this process are illustrated below.

The explicit closed formulas for the Cantor set are

$$\mathcal{C}=[0,1] \,\smallsetminus\, \bigcup_{n=0}^\infty \bigcup_{k=0}^{3^n-1} \left(\frac{3k+1}{3^{n+1}},\frac{3k+2}{3^{n+1}} \right)\!,$$

where every middle third is removed as the open interval $\left(\frac{3k+1}{3^{n+1}},\frac{3k+2}{3^{n+1}}\right)$ from the closed interval $\left[\frac{3k+0}{3^{n+1}},\frac{3k+3}{3^{n+1}}\right] = \left[\frac{k+0}{3^n},\frac{k+1}{3^n}\right]$ surrounding it, or

$$\mathcal{C}=\bigcap_{n=1}^\infty \bigcup_{k=0}^{3^{n-1}-1} \left( \left[\frac{3k+0}{3^n},\frac{3k+1}{3^n}\right] \cup \left[\frac{3k+2}{3^n},\frac{3k+3}{3^n}\right] \right)\!,$$

where the middle third $\left(\frac{3k+1}{3^n},\frac{3k+2}{3^n}\right)$ of the foregoing closed interval $\left[\frac{k+0}{3^{n-1}},\frac{k+1}{3^{n-1}}\right] = \left[\frac{3k+0}{3^n},\frac{3k+3}{3^n}\right]$ is removed by intersecting with $\left[\frac{3k+0}{3^n},\frac{3k+1}{3^n}\right] \cup \left[\frac{3k+2}{3^n},\frac{3k+3}{3^n}\right]\!.$

This process of removing middle thirds is a simple example of a finite subdivision rule. The complement of the Cantor ternary set is an example of a fractal string.

Points in the Cantor set can be uniquely located using an infinitely deep binary tree.

In arithmetical terms, the Cantor set consists of all real numbers of the unit interval $[0,1]$ that do not require the digit 1 in order to be expressed as a ternary (base 3) fraction. Each point in the Cantor set is uniquely located by a path through an infinitely deep binary tree, where the path turns left or right at each level according to which side of a deleted segment the point lies on. Representing each left turn with 0 and each right turn with 2 yields the ternary fraction for a point. Requiring the digit 1 is critical: $\frac{1}{3}$, which is included in the Cantor set, can be written as $0.1$, but also as $0.0\bar{2}$, which contains no 1 digits and corresponds to an initial left turn followed by infinitely many right turns in the binary tree.

=== Mandelbrot's construction by "curdling" ===
In The Fractal Geometry of Nature, mathematician Benoit Mandelbrot provides a whimsical thought experiment to assist non-mathematical readers in imagining the construction of $\mathcal{C}$. His narrative begins with imagining a bar, perhaps of lightweight metal, in which the bar's matter "curdles" by iteratively shifting towards its extremities. As the bar's segments become smaller, they become thin, dense slugs that eventually grow too small and faint to see.

CURDLING: The construction of the Cantor bar results from the process I call curdling. It begins with a round bar. It is best to think of it as having a very low density. Then matter "curdles" out of this bar's middle third into the end thirds, so that the positions of the latter remain unchanged. Next matter curdles out of the middle third of each end third into its end thirds, and so on ad infinitum until one is left with an infinitely large number of infinitely thin slugs of infinitely high density. These slugs are spaced along the line in the very specific fashion induced by the generating process. In this illustration, curdling (which eventually requires hammering!) stops when both the printer's press and our eye cease to follow; the last line is indistinguishable from the last but one: each of its ultimate parts is seen as a gray slug rather than two parallel black slugs.

== Composition ==
Since the Cantor set is defined as the set of points not excluded, the proportion (i.e., measure) of the unit interval remaining can be found by total length removed. This total is the geometric progression

$$\sum_{n=0}^\infty \frac{2^n}{3^{n+1}} = \frac{1}{3} + \frac{2}{9} + \frac{4}{27} + \frac{8}{81} + \cdots =  \frac{1}{3}\left(\frac{1}{1-\frac{2}{3}}\right) = 1.$$

So that the proportion left is $1 - 1 = 0$.

This calculation suggests that the Cantor set cannot contain any interval of non-zero length. It may seem surprising that there should be anything left—after all, the sum of the lengths of the removed intervals is equal to the length of the original interval. However, a closer look at the process reveals that there must be something left, since removing the "middle third" of each interval involved removing open sets (sets that do not include their endpoints). So removing the line segment $\left(\frac{1}{3}, \frac{2}{3}\right)$ from the original interval $[0, 1]$ leaves behind the points 1/3 and 2/3. Subsequent steps do not remove these (or other) endpoints, since the intervals removed are always internal to the intervals remaining. So the Cantor set is not empty, and in fact contains an uncountably infinite number of points (as follows from the above description in terms of paths in an infinite binary tree).

It may appear that only the endpoints of the construction segments are left, but that is not the case either. The number 1/4, for example, has the unique ternary form 0.020202... = 0.0̅2̅. It is in the bottom third, and the top third of that third, and the bottom third of that top third, and so on. Since it is never in one of the middle segments, it is never removed. Yet it is also not an endpoint of any middle segment, because it is not a multiple of any power of 1/3. All endpoints of segments are terminating ternary fractions and are contained in the set

$$\left\{x \in [0,1] \mid \exists i \in \N_0: x \, 3^i \in \Z \right\} \qquad \Bigl(\subset \N_0 \, 3^{-\N_0} \Bigr)$$

which is a countably infinite set. As to cardinality, almost all elements of the Cantor set are not endpoints of intervals, nor rational points like 1/4. The whole Cantor set is in fact not countable.

== Properties ==
=== Cardinality ===
It can be shown that there are as many points left behind in this process as there were to begin with, and that therefore, the Cantor set is uncountable. To see this, we show that there is a function f from the Cantor set $\mathcal{C}$ to the closed interval $[0, 1]$ that is surjective (i.e. f maps from $\mathcal{C}$ onto $[0, 1]$) so that the cardinality of $\mathcal{C}$ is no less than that of $[0, 1]$. Since $\mathcal{C}$ is a subset of $[0, 1]$, its cardinality is also no greater, so the two cardinalities must in fact be equal, by the Cantor–Bernstein–Schröder theorem.

To construct this function, consider the points in the $[0, 1]$ interval in terms of base 3 (or ternary) notation. Recall that the proper ternary fractions, more precisely: the elements of $\bigl(\Z \smallsetminus \{0\}\bigr) \cdot 3^{-\N_0}$, admit more than one representation in this notation, as for example 1/3, that can be written as 0.1_{3} = 0.10̅_{3}, but also as 0.0222..._{3} = 0.02̅_{3}, and 2/3, that can be written as 0.2_{3} = 0.20̅_{3} but also as 0.1222..._{3} = 0.12̅_{3}. When we remove the middle third, this contains the numbers with ternary numerals of the form 0.1xxxxx..._{3} where xxxxx..._{3} is strictly between 00000..._{3} and 22222..._{3}. So the numbers remaining after the first step consist of

- Numbers of the form 0.0xxxxx..._{3} (including 0.022222..._{3} = 1/3)
- Numbers of the form 0.2xxxxx..._{3} (including 0.222222..._{3} = 1)

This can be summarized by saying that those numbers with a ternary representation such that the first digit after the radix point is not 1 are the ones remaining after the first step.

The second step removes numbers of the form 0.01xxxx..._{3} and 0.21xxxx..._{3}, and (with appropriate care for the endpoints) it can be concluded that the remaining numbers are those with a ternary numeral where neither of the first two digits is 1.

Continuing in this way, for a number not to be excluded at step n, it must have a ternary representation whose nth digit is not 1. For a number to be in the Cantor set, it must not be excluded at any step, it must admit a numeral representation consisting entirely of 0s and 2s.

It is worth emphasizing that numbers like 1, 1/3 = 0.1_{3} and 7/9 = 0.21_{3} are in the Cantor set, as they have ternary numerals consisting entirely of 0s and 2s: 1 = 0.222..._{3} = 0.2̅_{3}, 1/3 = 0.0222..._{3} = 0.02̅_{3} and 7/9 = 0.20222..._{3} = 0.202̅_{3}. All the latter numbers are "endpoints", and these examples are right limit points of $\mathcal{C}$. The same is true for the left limit points of $\mathcal{C}$, e.g. 2/3 = 0.1222..._{3} = 0.12̅_{3} = 0.20̅_{3} and 8/9 = 0.21222..._{3} = 0.212̅_{3} = 0.220̅_{3}. All these endpoints are proper ternary fractions (elements of $\Z \cdot 3^{-\N_0}$) of the form p/q, where denominator q is a power of 3 when the fraction is in its irreducible form. The ternary representation of these fractions terminates (i.e., is finite) or — recall from above that proper ternary fractions each have 2 representations — is infinite and "ends" in either infinitely many recurring 0s or infinitely many recurring 2s. Such a fraction is a left limit point of $\mathcal{C}$ if its ternary representation contains no 1's and "ends" in infinitely many recurring 0s. Similarly, a proper ternary fraction is a right limit point of $\mathcal{C}$ if it again its ternary expansion contains no 1's and "ends" in infinitely many recurring 2s.

This set of endpoints is dense in $\mathcal{C}$ (but not dense in $[0, 1]$) and makes up a countably infinite set. The numbers in $\mathcal{C}$ which are not endpoints also have only 0s and 2s in their ternary representation, but they cannot end in an infinite repetition of the digit 0, nor of the digit 2, because then it would be an endpoint.

The function from $\mathcal{C}$ to $[0, 1]$ is defined by taking the ternary numerals that do consist entirely of 0s and 2s, replacing all the 2s by 1s, and interpreting the sequence as a binary representation of a real number. In a formula,

$f \bigg( \sum_{k\in \N} a_k 3^{-k} \bigg) = \sum_{k\in \N} \frac{a_k}{2} 2^{-k}$ where $\forall k\in \N : a_k \in \{0,2\} .$

For any number y in $[0, 1]$, its binary representation can be translated into a ternary representation of a number x in $\mathcal{C}$ by replacing all the 1s by 2s. With this, f(x) = y so that y is in the range of f. For instance if y = 3/5 = 0.100110011001..._{2} = 0.1̅0̅0̅1̅, we write x = 0.2̅0̅0̅2̅ = 0.200220022002..._{3} = 7/10. Consequently, f is surjective. However, f is not injective — the values for which f(x) coincides are those at opposing ends of one of the middle thirds removed. For instance, take

1/3 = 0.02̅_{3} (which is a right limit point of $\mathcal{C}$ and a left limit point of the middle third [1/3, 2/3]) and
2/3 = 0.20̅_{3} (which is a left limit point of $\mathcal{C}$ and a right limit point of the middle third [1/3, 2/3])

so

$$\begin{array}{lcl}
f\bigl({}^1\!\!/\!_3 \bigr) = f(0.0\overline{2}_3) = 0.0\overline{1}_2 = \!\! & \!\! 0.1_2 \!\! & \!\! = 0.1\overline{0}_2 = f(0.2\overline{0}_3) = f\bigl({}^2\!\!/\!_3 \bigr) . \\
& \parallel \\
& {}^1\!\!/\!_2
\end{array}$$

Thus there are as many points in the Cantor set as there are in the interval $[0, 1]$ (which has the uncountable cardinality $\mathfrak{c} = 2^{\aleph_0}$). However, the set of endpoints of the removed intervals is countable, so there must be uncountably many numbers in the Cantor set which are not interval endpoints. As noted above, one example of such a number is 1/4, which can be written as 0.020202..._{3} = 0.0̅2̅ in ternary notation. In fact, given any $a\in[-1,1]$, there exist $x,y\in\mathcal{C}$ such that $a = y-x$. This was first demonstrated by Steinhaus in 1917, who proved, via a geometric argument, the equivalent assertion that $\{(x,y)\in\mathbb{R}^2 \mid y=x+a\} \; \cap \; (\mathcal{C}\times\mathcal{C}) \neq\emptyset$ for every $a\in[-1,1]$. Since this construction provides an injection from $[-1,1]$ to $\mathcal{C}\times\mathcal{C}$, we have $|\mathcal{C}\times\mathcal{C}|\geq|[-1,1]|=\mathfrak{c}$ as an immediate corollary. Assuming that $|A\times A|=|A|$ for any infinite set $A$ (a statement shown to be equivalent to the axiom of choice by Tarski), this provides another demonstration that $|\mathcal{C}|=\mathfrak{c}$.

The Cantor set contains as many points as the interval from which it is taken, yet itself contains no interval of nonzero length. The irrational numbers have the same property, but the Cantor set has the additional property of being closed, so it is not even dense in any interval, unlike the irrational numbers which are dense in every interval.

It has been conjectured that all algebraic irrational numbers are normal. Since members of the Cantor set are not normal in base 3, this would imply that all members of the Cantor set are either rational or transcendental.

=== Self-similarity ===
The Cantor set is the prototype of a fractal. It is self-similar, because it is equal to two copies of itself, if each copy is shrunk by a factor of 3 and translated. More precisely, the Cantor set is equal to the union of two functions, the left and right self-similarity transformations of itself, $T_L(x)=x/3$ and $T_R(x)=(2+x)/3$, which leave the Cantor set invariant up to homeomorphism: $T_L(\mathcal{C})\cong T_R(\mathcal{C})\cong \mathcal{C}=T_L(\mathcal{C})\cup T_R(\mathcal{C}).$

Repeated iteration of $T_L$ and $T_R$ can be visualized as an infinite binary tree. That is, at each node of the tree, one may consider the subtree to the left or to the right. Taking the set $\{T_L, T_R\}$ together with function composition forms a monoid, the dyadic monoid.

Elements of the Cantor set can be associated with the 2-adic integers, so as with usual integers, the automorphism group is the modular group. Thus the automorphisms of the Cantor set are hyperbolic motions, particular isometries of the hyperbolic plane. Thus, the Cantor set is a homogeneous space in the sense that for any two points $x$ and $y$ in the Cantor set $\mathcal{C}$, there exists a homeomorphism $h:\mathcal{C}\to \mathcal{C}$ with $h(x)=y$. An explicit construction of $h$ can be described more easily if we see the Cantor set as a product space of countably many copies of the discrete space $\{0,1\}$. Then the map $h:\{0,1\}^\N\to\{0,1\}^\N$ defined by $h_n(u):=u_n+x_n+y_n \mod 2$ is an involutive homeomorphism exchanging $x$ and $y$.

=== Topological and analytical properties ===
Although "the" Cantor set typically refers to the original, middle-thirds Cantor set described above, topologists often talk about "a" Cantor set, which means any topological space that is homeomorphic (topologically equivalent) to it.

As the above summation argument shows, the Cantor set is uncountable but has Lebesgue measure 0. Since the Cantor set is the complement of a union of open sets, it itself is a closed subset of the reals, and therefore a complete metric space. Since it is also totally bounded, the Heine–Borel theorem says that it must be compact.

For any point in the Cantor set and any arbitrarily small neighborhood of the point, there is some other number with a ternary numeral of only 0s and 2s, as well as numbers whose ternary numerals contain 1s. Hence, every point in the Cantor set is an accumulation point (also called a cluster point or limit point) of the Cantor set, but none is an interior point. A closed set in which every point is an accumulation point is also called a perfect set in topology, while a closed subset of the interval with no interior points is nowhere dense in the interval.

Every point of the Cantor set is also an accumulation point of the complement of the Cantor set.

For any two points in the Cantor set, there will be some ternary digit where they differ — one will have 0 and the other 2. By splitting the Cantor set into "halves" depending on the value of this digit, one obtains a partition of the Cantor set into two closed sets that separate the original two points. In the relative topology on the Cantor set, the points have been separated by a clopen set. Consequently, the Cantor set is totally disconnected. As a compact totally disconnected Hausdorff space, the Cantor set is an example of a Stone space.

As a topological space, the Cantor set is naturally homeomorphic to the product of countably many copies of the space $\{0, 1\}$, where each copy carries the discrete topology. This is the space of all sequences in two digits

$$2^\mathbb{N} = \{(x_n) \mid x_n \in \{0,1\} \text{ for } n \in \mathbb{N}\},$$

which can also be identified with the set of 2-adic integers. The basis for the open sets of the product topology are cylinder sets; the homeomorphism maps these to the subspace topology that the Cantor set inherits from the natural topology on the real line. This characterization of the Cantor space as a product of compact spaces gives a second proof that Cantor space is compact, via Tychonoff's theorem.

From the above characterization, the Cantor set is homeomorphic to the p-adic integers, and, if one point is removed from it, to the p-adic numbers.

The Cantor set is a subset of the reals, which are a metric space with respect to the ordinary distance metric; therefore the Cantor set itself is a metric space, by using that same metric. Alternatively, one can use the p-adic metric on $2^\mathbb{N}$: given two sequences $(x_n),(y_n)\in 2^\mathbb{N}$, the distance between them is $d((x_n),(y_n)) = 2^{-k}$, where $k$ is the smallest index such that $x_k \ne y_k$; if there is no such index, then the two sequences are the same, and one defines the distance to be zero. These two metrics generate the same topology on the Cantor set.

We have seen above that the Cantor set is a totally disconnected perfect compact metric space. Indeed, in a sense it is the only one: every nonempty totally disconnected perfect compact metric space is homeomorphic to the Cantor set. See Cantor space for more on spaces homeomorphic to the Cantor set.

The Cantor set is sometimes regarded as "universal" in the category of compact metric spaces, since any compact metric space is a continuous image of the Cantor set; however this construction is not unique and so the Cantor set is not universal in the precise categorical sense. The "universal" property has important applications in functional analysis, where it is sometimes known as the representation theorem for compact metric spaces.

For any integer q ≥ 2, the topology on the group G = Z_{q}^{ω} (the countable direct sum) is discrete. Although the Pontrjagin dual Γ is also Z_{q}^{ω}, the topology of Γ is compact. One can see that Γ is totally disconnected and perfect - thus it is homeomorphic to the Cantor set. It is easiest to write out the homeomorphism explicitly in the case q = 2. (See Rudin 1962 p 40.)

=== Measure and probability ===
The Cantor set can be seen as the compact group of binary sequences, and as such, it is endowed with a natural Haar measure. When normalized so that the measure of the set is 1, it is a model of an infinite sequence of coin tosses. Furthermore, one can show that the usual Lebesgue measure on the interval is an image of the Haar measure on the Cantor set, while the natural injection into the ternary set is a canonical example of a singular measure. It can also be shown that the Haar measure is an image of any probability, making the Cantor set a universal probability space in some ways.

In Lebesgue measure theory, the Cantor set is an example of a set which is uncountable and has zero measure. In contrast, the set has a Hausdorff measure of $1$ in its dimension of $\log_3(2)$.

=== Cantor numbers ===
If we define a Cantor number as a member of the Cantor set, then

1. Every real number in $[0, 2]$ is the sum of two Cantor numbers.
2. Between any two Cantor numbers there is a number that is not a Cantor number.

=== Descriptive set theory ===
The Cantor set is a meagre set (or a set of first category) as a subset of $[0, 1]$ (although not as a subset of itself, since it is a Baire space). The Cantor set thus demonstrates that notions of "size" in terms of cardinality, measure, and (Baire) category need not coincide. Like the set $\mathbb{Q}\cap[0,1]$, the Cantor set $\mathcal{C}$ is "small" in the sense that it is a null set (a set of measure zero) and it is a meagre subset of $[0, 1]$. However, unlike $\mathbb{Q}\cap[0,1]$, which is countable and has a "small" cardinality, $\aleph_0$, the cardinality of $\mathcal{C}$ is the same as that of $[0, 1]$, the continuum $\mathfrak{c}$, and is "large" in the sense of cardinality. In fact, it is also possible to construct a subset of $[0, 1]$ that is meagre but of positive measure and a subset that is non-meagre but of measure zero: By taking the countable union of "fat" Cantor sets $\mathcal{C}^{(n)}$ of measure $\lambda = (n-1)/n$ (see Smith–Volterra–Cantor set below for the construction), we obtain a set $\mathcal{A} := \bigcup_{n=1}^{\infty}\mathcal{C}^{(n)}$which has a positive measure (equal to 1) but is meagre in [0,1], since each $\mathcal{C}^{(n)}$ is nowhere dense. Then consider the set $\mathcal{A}^{\mathrm{c}} = [0,1] \smallsetminus\bigcup_{n=1}^\infty \mathcal{C}^{(n)}$. Since $\mathcal{A}\cup\mathcal{A}^{\mathrm{c}} = [0,1]$, $\mathcal{A}^{\mathrm{c}}$ cannot be meagre, but since $\mu(\mathcal{A})=1$, $\mathcal{A}^{\mathrm{c}}$ must have measure zero.

== Variants ==
Radial plot of the first ten steps

=== Smith–Volterra–Cantor set ===
Instead of repeatedly removing the middle third of every piece as in the Cantor set, we could also keep removing any other fixed percentage (other than 0% and 100%) from the middle. In the case where the middle 8/10 of the interval is removed, we get a remarkably accessible case — the set consists of all numbers in [0,1] that can be written as a decimal consisting entirely of 0s and 9s. If a fixed percentage is removed at each stage, then the limiting set will have measure zero, since the length of the remainder $(1-f)^n\to 0$ as $n\to\infty$ for any $f$ such that $0<f\leq 1$.

On the other hand, "fat Cantor sets" of positive measure can be generated by removal of smaller fractions of the middle of the segment in each iteration. Thus, one can construct sets homeomorphic to the Cantor set that have positive Lebesgue measure while still being nowhere dense. If an interval of length $r^n$ ($r\leq 1/3$) is removed from the middle of each segment at the nth iteration, then the total length removed is $\sum_{n=1}^\infty 2^{n-1}r^n=r/(1-2r)$, and the limiting set will have a Lebesgue measure of $\lambda=(1-3r)/(1-2r)$. Thus, in a sense, the middle-thirds Cantor set is a limiting case with $r=1/3$. If $0<r<1/3$, then the remainder will have positive measure with $0<\lambda<1$. The case $r=1/4$ is known as the Smith–Volterra–Cantor set, which has a Lebesgue measure of $1/2$.

=== Cantor dust ===
Cantor dust is a multi-dimensional version of the Cantor set. It can be formed by taking a finite Cartesian product of the Cantor set with itself, making it a Cantor space. Like the Cantor set, Cantor dust has zero measure.

Cantor cubes recursion progression towards Cantor dust

Cantor dust (2D)

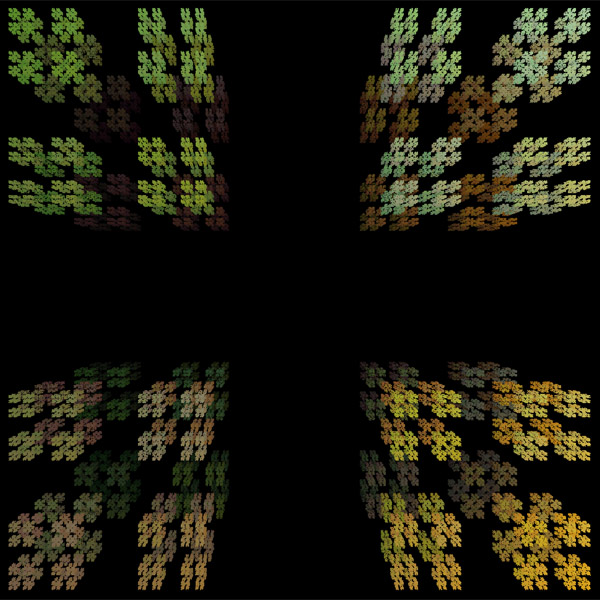
Cantor dust (3D)

A different 2D analogue of the Cantor set is the Sierpinski carpet, where a square is divided up into nine smaller squares, and the middle one removed. The remaining squares are then further divided into nine each and the middle removed, and so on ad infinitum. One 3D analogue of this is the Menger sponge.

== Historical remarks ==
an image of the 2nd iteration of Cantor dust in two dimensions

an image of the 4th iteration of Cantor dust in two dimensions

Cantor introduced what we call today the Cantor ternary set $\mathcal C$ as an example "of a perfect point-set, which is not everywhere-dense in any interval, however small." Cantor described $\mathcal C$ in terms of ternary expansions, as "the set of all real numbers given by the formula: $z=c_1/3 +c_2/3^2 + \cdots + c_\nu/3^\nu +\cdots$where the coefficients $c_\nu$ arbitrarily take the two values 0 and 2, and the series can consist of a finite number or an infinite number of elements."

A topological space $P$ is perfect if all its points are limit points or, equivalently, if it coincides with its derived set $P'$. Subsets of the real line, like $\mathcal C$, can be seen as topological spaces under the induced subspace topology.

Cantor was led to the study of derived sets by his results on uniqueness of trigonometric series. The latter did much to set him on the course for developing an abstract, general theory of infinite sets.

Benoit Mandelbrot wrote much on Cantor dusts and their relation to natural fractals and statistical physics. He further reflected on the puzzling or even upsetting nature of such structures to those in the mathematics and physics community. In The Fractal Geometry of Nature, he described how "When I started on this topic in 1962, everyone was agreeing that Cantor dusts are at least as monstrous as the Koch and Peano curves," and added that "every self-respecting physicist was automatically turned off by a mention of Cantor, ready to run a mile from anyone claiming $\mathcal C$ to be interesting in science."

== See also ==
an image of the 5th iteration of Cantor dust in two dimensions

- The indicator function of the Cantor set
- Smith–Volterra–Cantor set
- Cantor function
- Cantor cube
- Antoine's necklace
- Koch snowflake
- Knaster–Kuratowski fan
- List of fractals by Hausdorff dimension
- Moser–de Bruijn sequence
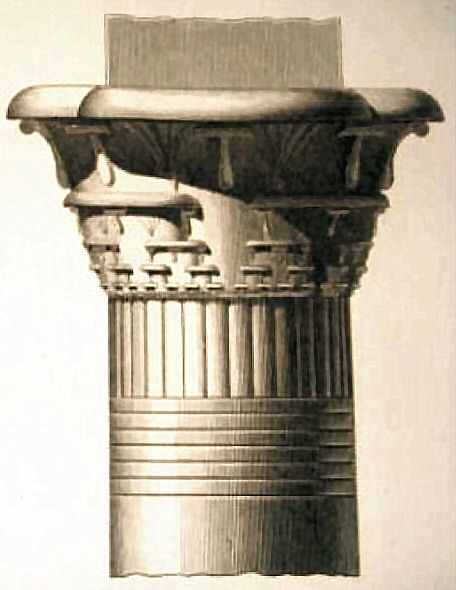
  Column capital with pattern evocative of the Cantor set, but expressed in binary rather than ternary. Engraving of Île de Philae from Description d'Égypte by Jean-Baptiste Prosper Jollois and Édouard Devilliers, Imprimerie Impériale, Paris, 1809-1828
