= Cantor space =

Topological space

In mathematics, a Cantor space, named for Georg Cantor, is a topological abstraction of the classical Cantor set: a topological space is a Cantor space if it is homeomorphic to the Cantor set. In set theory, the topological space 2^{ω} is called "the" Cantor space.

== Examples ==
The Cantor set itself is a Cantor space. But the canonical example of a Cantor space is the countably infinite topological product of the discrete 2-point space {0, 1}. This is usually written as $2^\mathbb{N}$ or 2^{ω} (where 2 denotes the 2-element set {0,1} with the discrete topology). A point in 2^{ω} is an infinite binary sequence, that is a sequence that assumes only the values 0 or 1. Given such a sequence a_{0}, a_{1}, a_{2},..., one can map it to the real number

$$\sum_{n=0}^\infty \frac{2 a_n}{3^{n+1}}.$$

This mapping gives a homeomorphism from 2^{ω} onto the Cantor set, demonstrating that 2^{ω} is indeed a Cantor space.

Cantor spaces occur abundantly in real analysis. For example, they exist as subspaces in every non-empty perfect, complete metric space. (To see this, note that in such a space, any non-empty perfect set contains two disjoint non-empty perfect subsets of arbitrarily small diameter, and so one can imitate the construction of the usual Cantor set.) Also, every uncountable, separable, completely metrizable space contains Cantor spaces as subspaces. This includes most of the common spaces in real analysis.

== Characterization ==
A topological characterization of Cantor spaces is given by Brouwer's theorem:

Brouwer's theorem—Any two non-empty compact Hausdorff spaces without isolated points and having countable bases consisting of clopen sets are homeomorphic to each other.

The topological property of having a base consisting of clopen sets is sometimes known as "zero-dimensionality". Brouwer's theorem can be restated as:

Theorem—A topological space is a Cantor space if and only if it is non-empty, perfect, compact, totally disconnected, and metrizable.

This theorem is also equivalent (via Stone's representation theorem for Boolean algebras) to the fact that any two countable atomless Boolean algebras are isomorphic.

Without metrizability, the statement fails. A Cantor cube $2^\alpha$, for $\alpha$ an uncountable ordinal, is not homeomorphic to the Cantor space (and thus is not metrizable).

== Properties ==
As can be expected from Brouwer's theorem, Cantor spaces appear in several forms. But many properties of Cantor spaces can be established using 2^{ω}, because its construction as a product makes it amenable to analysis.

Cantor spaces have the following properties:

- The cardinality of any Cantor space is $2^{\aleph_0}$, that is, the cardinality of the continuum.
- The product of two (or even any finite or countable number of) Cantor spaces is a Cantor space. Along with the Cantor function, this fact can be used to construct space-filling curves.
- A (non-empty) Hausdorff topological space is compact metrizable if and only if it is a continuous image of a Cantor space.

Let C(X) denote the space of all real-valued, bounded continuous functions on a topological space X. Let K denote a compact metric space, and Δ denote the Cantor set. Then the Cantor set has the following property:

- C(K) is isometric to a closed subspace of C(Δ).

In general, this isometry is not unique, and thus is not properly a universal property in the categorical sense.

- The group of all homeomorphisms of the Cantor space is simple.

== Cantor group ==
The Cantor space becomes an abelian group $\{0,1\}^{\mathbb Z}$ where the group operation is defined as pointwise addition modulo 2. Thus if $(x_i)_{i\in\mathbb Z}$ and $(y_i)_{i\in\mathbb Z}$ are two points of the Cantor space, with $x_i,y_i\in\{0,1\}$, the group law is given by
$$(x_i) + (y_i) = (x_i+y_i\bmod 2).$$
The identity element is the constant sequence $x_i=0$. Since $x+x\equiv 0\pmod{2}$ for any $x\in\{0,1\}$, every nonidentity element of the group is an involution, i.e., $(x_i) + (x_i) = (0)_{i\in\mathbb Z}$ or, equivalently, the inverse element of $(x_i)$ is $(x_i)$ itself, i.e., $-(x_i) = (x_i)$.

The Cantor group is a compact abelian topological group, making it an important example in abstract harmonic analysis. Every continuous character on the Cantor group Every continuous character of $G=\{0,1\}^{\mathbb Z}$ has the form
$$\chi_F(x)=(-1)^{\sum_{i\in F}x_i},$$
where $F\subset\mathbb Z$ is finite. Thus the Pontryagin dual is naturally identified with the group of finite subsets of $\mathbb Z$, under symmetric difference, or equivalently with
$$\bigoplus_{\mathbb Z}\mathbb Z/2\mathbb Z$$
under addition. This can be identified with the additive group
$$\widehat G = \mathbb F_2[t^{-1},t]$$
of Laurent polynomials over the field with two elements. Here $t$ corresponds to the character $\chi_1(x) = (-1)^{x_1}.$ This group is sometimes known as the Walsh group in this context.

A particularly important group of automorphisms of the Cantor group are the shift maps
$$s_n(x_i) = (x_{i+n})$$
for $n$ an integer. The effect of $s_n$ is to shift the sequence to the left $n$ units (if $n > 0$) or to the right by $|n|$ units (if $n < 0$). The mapping $n\mapsto s_n$ is a representation of the additive group of integers $\mathbb Z$ into the autormorphism group of $G$. On characters, the shift action is $\chi\circ s_n = t^n\chi$.

The Haar measure on the Cantor group is the probability measure that independently assigns each coordinate $x_i$ an equal probability $1/2$ of coming up $0$ or $1$. Equivalently, the measure assigned to a cylinder set $X = \{(x_i) | x_{i_1}=a_1, x_{i_2}=a_2,\dots, x_{i_k}=a_k\}$, where the indices $i_j$ are distinct, is $2^{-k}$.

The Cantor space $2^{\mathbb N}$ maps to the unit interval, by the map $(x_i)_{i\in\mathbb N} \mapsto \sum_{n=0}^\infty\frac{x_n}{2^{n+1}}$. Under this map, the pushforward measure of the Haar measure is the Lebesgue measure, and the coordinate characters correspond almost everywhere to the Rademacher functions. This view is useful in the harmonic analysis.

The Cantor group is a protypical example of a profinite group. It is the inverse limit of the groups $F_2^n$ under the coordinate projection maps $F_2^{n+1}\to F_2^n$. Topologically, every infinite metrizable profinite group is homeomorphic to the Cantor space, but need not be isomorphic to it. An example is the additive group $\mathbb Z_2$ of 2-adic integers. This is an inverse limit of the groups $\mathbb Z/2^n\mathbb Z$ under the reduction maps $\mathbb Z/2^{n+1}\xrightarrow{\bmod 2^n}\mathbb Z/2^n\mathbb Z$, but is not isomorphic to it as a group. For example, $\mathbb Z_2$ contains no nontrivial involutions. More generally, the additive group of the p-adic integers is homeomorphic to the Cantor space (as is the ring of integers in any non-archimedean local field).

== Topology ==
The topology of the Cantor space can be specified by giving the basic open sets. Given a finite sequence $a_0,\dots,a_n\in\{0,1\}$, the cylinder set
$$U(a_0,\dots,a_n) = \{ (x_i)_{i\in\mathbb N} | x_0 = a_0,\dots,x_n=a_n\}$$
is an open set. It is also a closed set, its complement being the union of open sets $U(a'_0,\dots,a'_n)$ where at least one $a_i'$ is different from $a_i$. Thus it is a clopen set. Not every open subset of the Cantor space is clopen, but this basis of the topology consists entirely of clopen sets, a general feature of profinite spaces.

This basis of the topology can be described as follows. If $F$ is a finite subset of $\mathbb N$, then there is a projection $\pi_F : \{0,1\}^{\mathbb N}\to \{0,1\}^F$ corresponding to restricting the coordinates to $F$. Now, $\{0,1\}^F$ is a finite set, and it can be given the discrete topology. The topology on the Cantor space is the coarsest topology making all of the maps $\pi_F$ continuous; i.e., it is the initial topology of the family of projections. The basic open sets are thus stratified into
$$\mathcal U_F = \{\pi_F^{-1}(S) | S\subset \{0,1\}^F\}.$$
The topology on the Cantor space is generated by $\bigcup_{F \subset \mathbb N,\, |F|<\infty} \mathcal U_F$, by closing this under the unions of elements.

=== Continuous functions ===
A function on the Cantor space is continuous if, for every $\epsilon > 0$ there is a finite set $F$ of integers such that $|f(x) - f(y)| < \epsilon$ for all $x$ and $y$ that agree on $F$.

=== Locally constant functions and distributions ===
A particular subspace of the space of continuous functions is the locally constant functions. A function is locally constant if there is a partition of the Cantor space into clopen subsets, such that the function is constant on each set of the partition. Let $C_{lc}(\Delta)$ denote the space of locally constant functions on the Cantor space $\Delta$. The space $C_{lc}(\Delta)$ carries a finer topology than $C(\Delta)$ by declaring that a sequence $f_n\to 0$ if any only if all but finitely many $f_n$ depend only on a single finite set $F$ of coordinates, and converge to zero in that finite-dimensional space of functions on $\{0,1\}^F$. This stronger topology is a nuclear topology defining a space of test functions and whose continuous dual defines a space of distributions.

== Banach algebras ==
Several natural commutative Banach algebras are associated with the Cantor space (or group) $\Delta$. The Banach algebra $C(\Delta)$ under pointwise multiplication, with the supremum norm, is the most fundamental. Because $\Delta$ is a compact Hausdorff space, it has the property that the Gelfand spectrum is $\Delta$ itself, and the Gelfand embedding $C(\Delta)\to C(\Delta^\vee)$ is an isomorphism (and is canonical).

On the Cantor group, another Banach algebra is the group algebra, which is the space $L^1(\Delta, \mu)$ of $L^1$-integrable classes of functions on $\Delta$ with respect to the Haar measure $\mu$, and the convolution operation as multiplication:
$$(f*g)(t) = \int_\Delta f(t-x)g(x)\,dx.$$
The maximal ideal space is the Pontryan dual $\widehat\Delta=\bigoplus_{\mathbb Z}\mathbb Z/2\mathbb Z$. The Gelfand transform is the Fourier transform, associating to $f\in L^1(\Delta,\mu)$ the function $\hat f(\gamma)$ of a character $\gamma$ given by $\hat f(\gamma) = \int_\Delta f(x)\gamma(x)\,dx$ (there is no complex conjugate in the characters, because the characters are all real.)

Likewise, the algebra $\ell^1(\widehat\Delta)$ of absolutely summable functions on the countable discrete group $\widehat\Delta$ is a group algebra under the group convolution. Then $\Delta$ is the space of maximal ideals in $\ell^1(\widehat\Delta)$, and the Fourier transform is a one-to-one map from $\ell^1(\widehat\Delta)$ onto a subalgebra of $C(\Delta)$, the Wiener algebra. The Wiener algebra $A(\Delta)$ includes all of the locally constant functions, but is a proper subset of $C(\Delta)$:
$$C_{lc}(\Delta)\subset A(\Delta) \subset C(\Delta).$$

== See also ==
- Space (mathematics)
- Cantor cube
