= Closed set =

Complement of an open subset

The boundary of the unit disc (pink) is the unit circle (blue). The open disc $\|x\| < 1$ does not include the boundary $\|x\|=1$, while the closed unit disc $\|x\|\le 1$ does include the boundary and is therefore a closed set. Topologically, the unit circle is its own boundary relative to the plane, and is therefore also closed.

In topology, a branch of mathematics, a closed set is a set that contains all of its boundary points. An example is the closed interval $[a,b]$, which is closed in the real line because it includes both points $a$ and $b$ of its boundary. A point is on the boundary if every neighbourhood of it meets both the set and its complement. A set is thus closed if it is equal to its closure, the set obtained by adjoining all boundary points to it.

Closed sets are defined as subsets of topological spaces. The topology of a space is usually described in terms of its open sets, which determine what counts as a "neighborhood" of its points. A set is closed if it is the complement of an open set. In metric spaces, a set is closed if and only if the limit of every convergent sequence of elements in the set has limit in this set; thus a closed set is a set that includes all of its limit points. Because the limits of convergent sequences do not escape a closed set, they are important in many areas of mathematics where limiting arguments are used.

A closed set is distinct from the notion of a closed curve or closed manifold. Those are also closed in the topological sense, but the term there usually means that the boundary in the relevant sense is empty. Likewise a closed differential form is not a set at all, but a form that has zero coboundary. Closed is thus used in a different, but related, sense in homology and cohomology.

== Definition ==
Given a topological space $(X, \tau)$, the following statements are equivalent:

1. a set $A \subseteq X$ is closed in $X.$
2. $A^c = X \setminus A$ is an open subset of $(X, \tau)$; that is, $A^{c} \in \tau.$
3. $A$ is equal to its closure in $X.$
4. $A$ contains all of its limit points.
5. $A$ contains all of its boundary points.

An alternative characterization of closed sets is available via sequences and nets. A subset $A$ of a topological space $X$ is closed in $X$ if and only if every limit of every net of elements of $A$ also belongs to $A.$ In a first-countable space (such as a metric space), it is enough to consider only convergent sequences, instead of all nets. One value of this characterization is that it may be used as a definition in the context of convergence spaces, which are more general than topological spaces. Notice that this characterization also depends on the surrounding space $X,$ because whether or not a sequence or net converges in $X$ depends on what points are present in $X.$ A point $x$ in $X$ is said to be close to a subset $A \subseteq X$ if $x \in \operatorname{cl}_X A$ (or equivalently, if $x$ belongs to the closure of $A$ in the topological subspace $A \cup \{ x \},$ meaning $x \in \operatorname{cl}_{A \cup \{ x \}} A$ where $A \cup \{ x \}$ is endowed with the subspace topology induced on it by $X$ (Note: In particular, whether or not $x$ is close to $A$ depends only on the subspace $A \cup \{ x \}$ and not on the whole surrounding space (e.g. $X,$ or any other space containing $A \cup \{ x \}$ as a topological subspace).)). Because the closure of $A$ in $X$ is thus the set of all points in $X$ that are close to $A,$ this terminology allows for an intuitive description of closed subsets:

a subset is closed if and only if it contains every point that is close to it.

In terms of net convergence, a point $x \in X$ is close to a subset $A$ if and only if there exists some net (valued) in $A$ that converges to $x.$ If $X$ is a topological subspace of some other topological space $Y,$ in which case $Y$ is called a topological super-space of $X,$ then there might exist some point in $Y \setminus X$ that is close to $A$ (although not an element of $X$), which is how it is possible for a subset $A \subseteq X$ to be closed in $X$ but to not be closed in the "larger" surrounding super-space $Y.$ If $A \subseteq X$ and if $Y$ is any topological super-space of $X$ then $A$ is always a (potentially proper) subset of $\operatorname{cl}_Y A,$ which denotes the closure of $A$ in $Y;$ indeed, even if $A$ is a closed subset of $X$ (which happens if and only if $A = \operatorname{cl}_X A$), it is nevertheless still possible for $A$ to be a proper subset of $\operatorname{cl}_Y A.$ However, $A$ is a closed subset of $X$ if and only if $A = X \cap \operatorname{cl}_Y A$ for some (or equivalently, for every) topological super-space $Y$ of $X.$

Closed sets can also be used to characterize continuous functions: a map $f : X \to Y$ is continuous if and only if $f\left( \operatorname{cl}_X A \right) \subseteq \operatorname{cl}_Y (f(A))$ for every subset $A \subseteq X$; this can be reworded intuitively as: $f$ is continuous if and only if for every subset $A \subseteq X,$ $f$ maps points that are close to $A$ to points that are close to $f(A).$ Similarly, $f$ is continuous at a fixed given point $x \in X$ if and only if whenever $x$ is close to a subset $A \subseteq X,$ then $f(x)$ is close to $f(A).$

== More about closed sets ==
The notion of closed set is defined above in terms of open sets, a concept that makes sense for topological spaces, as well as for other spaces that carry topological structures, such as metric spaces, differentiable manifolds, uniform spaces, and gauge spaces.

Whether a set is closed depends on the space in which it is embedded. However, the compact Hausdorff spaces are "absolutely closed", in the sense that, if you embed a compact Hausdorff space $D$ in an arbitrary Hausdorff space $X,$ then $D$ will always be a closed subset of $X$; the "surrounding space" does not matter here. Stone–Čech compactification, a process that turns a completely regular Hausdorff space into a compact Hausdorff space, may be described as adjoining limits of certain nonconvergent nets to the space.

Furthermore, every closed subset of a compact space is compact, and every compact subspace of a Hausdorff space is closed.

Closed sets also give a useful characterization of compactness: a topological space $X$ is compact if and only if every collection of nonempty closed subsets of $X$ with empty intersection admits a finite subcollection with empty intersection.

A topological space $X$ is disconnected if there exist disjoint, nonempty, open subsets $A$ and $B$ of $X$ whose union is $X.$ Furthermore, $X$ is totally disconnected if it has an open basis consisting of closed sets.

== Properties ==
A closed set contains its own boundary. In other words, if you are "outside" a closed set, you may move a small amount in any direction and still stay outside the set. This is also true if the boundary is the empty set, e.g. in the metric space of rational numbers, for the set of numbers of which the square is less than $2.$

- Any intersection of any family of closed sets is closed (this includes intersections of infinitely many closed sets)
- The union of finitely many closed sets is closed.
- The empty set is closed.
- The whole set is closed.

In fact, if given a set $X$ and a non-empty collection $\mathbb{F}$ of subsets of $X$ such that the elements of $\mathbb{F}$ have the properties listed above, then there exists a unique topology $\tau$ on $X$ such that the closed subsets of $(X, \tau)$ are exactly those sets that belong to $\mathbb{F}.$ The intersection property also allows one to define the closure of a set $A$ in a space $X,$ which is defined as the smallest closed subset of $X$ containing $A.$ Thus the closure of $A$ is the intersection of all closed sets containing it.

Sets that can be constructed as the union of countably many closed sets are denoted F_{σ} sets. These sets need not be closed. The Borel hierarchy classifies more complicated sets formed in the Borel sigma algebra, which includes the closed sets at the first level, the F_{σ}-sets in the second layer, and so on.

A perfect set is a closed set with no isolated points.

== Examples ==
- The closed interval $[a, b]$ of real numbers is closed. (See Interval (mathematics) for an explanation of the bracket and parenthesis set notation.)
- The unit interval $[0, 1]$ is closed in the metric space of real numbers, and the set $[0, 1] \cap \Q$ of rational numbers between $0$ and $1$ (inclusive) is closed in the space of rational numbers, but $[0, 1] \cap \Q$ is not closed in the real numbers.
- Some sets are neither open nor closed, for instance the half-open interval $[0, 1)$ in the real numbers.
- In the finite complement topology on a set $X$, the closed sets are precisely the finite subsets of $X$ together with $X$ itself.
- In the discrete topology on a set $X$, every subset of $X$ is closed.
- The ray $[1, +\infty)$ is closed.
- The Cantor set is closed because it is equal to its own boundary (it consists entirely of boundary points).
- Singleton points (and thus finite sets) are closed in T_{1} spaces and Hausdorff spaces.
- The set of integers $\Z$ is an infinite and unbounded closed set in the real numbers.
- If $f : X \to Y$ is a function between topological spaces then $f$ is continuous if and only if preimages of closed sets in $Y$ are closed in $X.$
- Each lower set of a preorder is closed in the Alexandrov topology on the preorder.
- Compact sets in a Hausdorff space are always closed. Compactness is a specialization of the idea of closedness that, in cases such as metric spaces, ensures that not only does a set contain all of its limits, but that every sequence has a subsequence with a limit in the set.

== Uses and importance ==
Closed sets are important throughout mathematics because they describe conditions that are preserved under limiting processes. In a metric space, for example, if a sequence of points in a closed set converges in the ambient space, then its limit remains in the set. Thus one can often prove that an object has a desired property by constructing it as a limit of objects that already have that property. Closed sets are therefore ubiquitous in mathematical analysis, which involves limiting arguments throughout.

Continuous maps provide one source of closed sets in many applications. A function between topological spaces is continuous if and only if the inverse image of every closed set is closed. Consequently, solution sets of continuous equations are closed: if $f:X\to\mathbb R$ is continuous, then the zero set
$$\{x\in X:f(x)=0\}=f^{-1}(\{0\})$$
is closed. More generally, level sets and constraint sets defined by continuous equalities are closed.

In real analysis, a set in Euclidean space is compact if and only if it is closed and bounded. This divides the labor of checking whether a set is compact into two properties that are more easily checked, often the closed property being the more difficult piece. The analogous statement is not true in other spaces. For example, the closed unit ball in an infinite-dimensional Banach space is closed but not compact.

The property of a set being closed is essential in optimization theory. The extreme value theorem is one basic example, and allows one to conclude that a continuous real-valued function on a closed and bounded (i.e., compact) subset of Euclidean space attains a maximum and minimum value somewhere.

In convex analysis, closedness is commonly expressed through epigraphs. A convex function is called closed when its epigraph is a closed set. This condition is closely related to lower semicontinuity and is important in existence and duality theorems for convex optimization.

In algebraic geometry, closed sets are used to encode systems of polynomial equations. In the Zariski topology on affine space, the closed sets are the algebraic sets, that is, the common zero sets of collections of polynomials. So in algebraic geometry, the closed sets, rather than the open sets, are often the primary objects of study.

In functional analysis, closedness is used to control infinite-dimensional limiting processes. A linear subspace of a normed vector space need not be closed. When it is not closed, limits of convergent sequences of vectors in the subspace may leave the subspace. Closed subspaces of Banach and Hilbert spaces are therefore especially important. Similarly, the closed graph theorem characterizes continuity of certain linear operators between Banach spaces by the closedness of their graphs.

In the study of topological groups, that is groups with a compatible topology, closed subgroups are often the most tractable cases of subgroups, because they inherit structures from the larger group that more general subgroups do not. An example is in Lie groups. While every subgroup of a Lie group is a topological group, it does not need to be a Lie group under the subspace topology. The correct statement is that a closed subgroup of a Lie group is a Lie subgroup, and its Lie algebra is a natural subspace of the Lie algebra of the larger group. Moreover, the space of cosets of a subgroup in a topological group is not a Hausdorff space unless the subgroup is closed, and conversely. Likewise, compact groups play a special role in analysis, for example their continuous unitary representations decompose into discrete pieces. A subgroup of a compact group need not be compact, but a closed subgroup is.

In totally disconnected spaces, especially in zero-dimensional spaces like Stone spaces, sets that are both open and closed play an important role. Such sets are called clopen sets. They provide the building blocks for many examples, including the Cantor set and spaces arising in p-adic analysis. In algebraic number theory, topological groups over non-Archimedean local fields are often studied in which compact open subgroups play an important role: they are topologically small neighborhoods of the identity, and are often algebraically or arithmetically useful subgroups.

== See also ==
- Clopen set – Subset which is both open and closed
- Closed map – Functions that send open (resp. closed) subsets to open (resp. closed) subsets
- Closed region – Connected open subset of a topological space
- Open set – Basic subset of a topological space
- Neighbourhood – Open set containing a given point
- Region (mathematics) – Connected open subset of a topological space
- Regular closed set
