= Fractal string =

Open subset of the real–number line

Seven iterations of the construction of the Cantor ternary set, an example of a fractal string.

An ordinary fractal string $\Omega$ is a bounded, open subset of the real number line. Such a subset can be written as an at-most-countable union of connected open intervals with associated lengths $\mathcal{L}=\{\ell_1,\ell_2,\ldots\}$ written in non-increasing order; we also refer to $\mathcal{L}$ as a fractal string. For example, $\mathcal{L}=\left\{ \frac 1 3, \frac 1 9, \frac 1 9,\ldots\right\}$ is a fractal string corresponding to the Cantor set. A fractal string is the analogue of a one-dimensional "fractal drum," and typically the set $\Omega$ has a boundary $\partial\Omega$ which corresponds to a fractal such as the Cantor set. The heuristic idea of a fractal string is to study a (one-dimensional) fractal using the "space around the fractal." It turns out that the sequence of lengths $\mathcal{L}$ of the set itself is "intrinsic," in the sense that the fractal string $\mathcal{L}$ itself (independent of a specific geometric realization of these lengths as corresponding to a choice of set $\Omega$) contains information about the fractal to which it corresponds.

For each fractal string $\mathcal{L}$, we can associate to $\mathcal{L}$ a geometric zeta function $\zeta_{\mathcal{L}}$: the Dirichlet series $\zeta_{\mathcal{L}} (s)=\sum_{j \in \mathbb{J}} \ell_j^{s}$. Informally, the geometric zeta function carries geometric information about the underlying fractal, particularly in the location of its poles and the residues of the zeta function at these poles. These poles of (the analytic continuation of) the geometric zeta function $\zeta_{\mathcal{L}} (s)$ are then called complex dimensions of the fractal string $\mathcal{L}$, and these complex dimensions appear in formulae which describe the geometry of the fractal.

For fractal strings associated with sets like Cantor sets, formed from deleted intervals that are rational powers of a fundamental length, the complex dimensions appear in an arithmetic progression parallel to the imaginary axis, and are called lattice fractal strings (For example, the complex dimensions of the Cantor set are $s=\frac{\log 2 + 2 \pi i k}{\log 3}$, which are an arithmetic progression in the direction of the imaginary axis). Otherwise, they are called non-lattice. In fact, an ordinary fractal string is Minkowski measurable if and only if it is non-lattice.

A generalized fractal string $\eta$ is defined to be a local positive or complex measure on $(0, +\infty)$ such that $|\eta|(0, x_0) = 0$ for some $x_0 > 0$, where the positive measure $|\eta|$ is the total variation measure associated to $\eta$. These generalized fractal strings allow for lengths to be given non-integer multiplicities (among other possibilities), and each ordinary fractal string can be associated with a measure that makes it into a generalized fractal string.

== Ordinary fractal strings ==
An ordinary fractal string $\Omega$ is a bounded, open subset of the real number line. Any such subset can be written as an at-most-countable union of connected open intervals with associated lengths $\mathcal{L}=\{\ell_1,\ell_2,\ldots\}$ written in non-increasing order. We allow $\Omega$ to consist of finitely many open intervals, in which case $\mathcal{L}$ consists of finitely many lengths. We refer to $\mathcal{L}$ as a fractal string.

=== Example ===
The middle third's Cantor set is constructed by removing the middle third from the unit interval $(0,1)$, then removing the middle thirds of the subsequent intervals, ad infinitum. The deleted intervals $\Omega=\left\{ \left(\frac 1 3, \frac 2 3 \right), \left( \frac 1 9, \frac 2 9 \right), \left( \frac 7 9, \frac 8 9 \right),\ldots\right\}$ have corresponding lengths $\mathcal{L}=\left\{ \frac 1 3, \frac 1 9, \frac 1 9,\ldots\right\}$. Inductively, we can show that there are $2^{n-1}$ intervals corresponding to each length of $3^{-n}$. Thus, we say that the multiplicity of the length $3^{-n}$ is $2^{n-1}$. The fractal string of the Cantor set is called the Cantor string.

=== Heuristic ===
The geometric information of the Cantor set in the example above is contained in the ordinary fractal string $\mathcal{L}$. From this information, we can compute the box-counting dimension of the Cantor set. This notion of fractal dimension can be generalized to that of complex dimension, which may be used to deduce geometrical information regarding the local oscillations in the geometry of the fractal. For example, the complex dimensions of a fractal string (such as the Cantor string) may be used to write an explicit tube formula for the volume of an $\varepsilon$-neighborhood of the fractal string, and the presence of non-real complex dimensions corresponds to oscillatory terms in this expansion.

== The geometric zeta function ==
If $\sum_{j \in \mathbb{J}} {\ell_j}< \infty,$ we say that $\Omega$ has a geometric realization in $\mathbb{R},$ $\Omega=\bigcup_{i=1}^\infty I_i$, where the $I_i$ are intervals in $\mathbb{R}$, of all the lengths $\{ \ell_j \}_{j \in \mathbb{J}}$, taken with multiplicity.

For each fractal string $\mathcal{L}$, we can associate to $\mathcal{L}$ a geometric zeta function $\zeta_{\mathcal{L}}$ defined as the Dirichlet series $\zeta_{\mathcal{L}} (s)=\sum_{j \in \mathbb{J}} \ell_j^{s}$. Poles of the geometric zeta function $\zeta_{\mathcal{L}} (s)$ are called complex dimensions of the fractal string $\mathcal{L}$. The general philosophy of the theory of complex dimensions for fractal strings is that complex dimensions describe the intrinsic oscillation in the geometry, spectra and dynamics of the fractal string $\mathcal{L}$.

The abscissa of convergence of $\zeta_{\mathcal{L}}(s)$ is defined as $\sigma=\inf \left\{ \alpha \in \mathbb{R} : \sum_{j=1}^\infty \ell_j^\alpha < \infty \right\}$.

For a fractal string $\mathcal{L}$ with infinitely many nonzero lengths, the abscissa of convergence $\sigma$ coincides with the Minkowski dimension of the boundary of the string, $\partial \Omega$. For our example, the boundary Cantor string is the Cantor set itself. So the abscissa of convergence of the geometric zeta function $\zeta_{\mathcal{L}}(s)$ is the Minkowski dimension of the Cantor set, which is $\frac{\log 2}{\log 3}$.

== Complex dimensions ==
For a fractal string $\mathcal{L}$, composed of an infinite sequence of lengths, the complex dimensions of the fractal string are the poles of the analytic continuation of the geometric zeta function associated with the fractal string. (When the analytic continuation of a geometric zeta function is not defined to all of the complex plane, we take a subset of the complex plane called the "window", and look for the "visible" complex dimensions that exist within that window.)

=== Example ===
Continuing with the example of the fractal string associated to the middle thirds Cantor set, we compute $\zeta_{\mathbb{C}}(s)=\sum_{n=1}^\infty \frac{2^{n-1}}{3^{ns}} =\frac{\frac{1}{3^s}}{1-\frac{2}{3^s}} = \frac{1}{3^s - 2}$. We compute the abscissa of convergence to be the value of $s$ satisfying $3^s=2$, so that $s=\log_3 2=\frac{\log 2}{\log 3}$ is the Minkowski dimension of the Cantor set. For complex $s$, $\zeta_{\mathbb{C}}(s)$ has poles at the infinitely many solutions of $3^s=2$, which, for this example, occur at $s=\frac{\log 2 + 2 \pi i k}{\log 3}$, for all integers $k$. This collection of points is called the set of complex dimensions of the middle thirds Cantor set.

== Applications ==
Ordinary and generalized fractal strings may be used to study the geometry of a (one-dimensional) fractal, as well as to relate the geometry of the object to its spectrum. For example, the geometric zeta function associated to a fractal string may be used to write an explicit tube formula for the volume of a neighborhood of the fractal. Regarding the connection between geometry and spectra, the spectral zeta function of a fractal string, which is the geometric zeta function times the Riemann zeta function, may be used to write explicit formulae which describe spectral counting functions.

The framework of fractal strings also serves to unify aspects of fractal and arithmetic geometry. For example, a general explicit formula for counting the (reciprocal) lengths of a fractal string may be used to prove Riemann's explicit formula when using a suitable generalized fractal string which is supported on the prime powers with multiplicities of each given by the logarithm of the prime base of the power.

For fractal strings associated with sets like Cantor sets, formed from deleted intervals that are rational powers of a fundamental length, the complex dimensions appear in a regular, arithmetic progression parallel to the imaginary axis, and are called lattice fractal strings. Sets that do not have this property are called non-lattice. There is a dichotomy in the theory of measures of such objects: an ordinary fractal string is Minkowski measurable if and only if it is non-lattice.

The existence of non-real complex dimensions with positive real part has been proposed by Michel Lapidus and Machiel van Frankenhuijsen to be the signature feature of fractal objects. Formally, they propose to define "fractality" as the presence of at least one nonreal complex dimension with positive real part. This new definition of fractality solves some old problems in fractal geometry. For example, according to the proposed definition of fractality in the sense of Mandelbrot, Cantor's devil's staircase is not fractal because its Hausdorff and topological dimensions coincide. However, the Cantor staircase function possesses many features which ought to be considered fractal such as self-similarity, and in this new sense of fractality the Cantor staircase function is considered fractal since it has non-real complex dimensions.

== Generalized fractal strings ==
A generalized fractal string $\eta$ is defined to be a local positive or local complex measure on $(0, +\infty)$ such that $|\eta|(0, x_0) = 0$ for some $x_0 > 0$, where the positive measure $|\eta|$ is the total variation measure associated to $\eta$. A generalized fractal string allows for a fractal string to have a given set of lengths with non-integer multiplicities, or for a fractal string to have a continuum of lengths instead of discrete. By convention, a generalized fractal string is supported on reciprocal lengths as opposed to an ordinary fractal string which is a multiset of (decreasing or non-increasing) lengths. In light of this, the condition that the measure has "no mass near zero," or more precisely that there exists a positive number $x_0 > 0$ such that the interval $(0,x_0)$ has measure zero with respect to $|\eta|$, may be seen as an analogue of the boundedness of the ordinary fractal string.

For example, if $\mathcal{L} = \{l_j\}_{j=1}^{\infty}$ is an ordinary fractal string with multiplicities $w_j$, then the measure $\eta_{\mathcal{L}} := \sum_{j=1}^{\infty} w_j\delta_{l_j^{-1}}$ associated to $\mathcal{L}$ (where $\delta_{\{x\}}$ refers to the Dirac delta measure concentrated at the point $x$) is an example of a generalized fractal string. Note that the delta functions are supported on the singleton sets $\{\ell_j^{-1}\}$ corresponding to the reciprocals of the lengths of the ordinary fractal string $\mathcal{L}$. If the multiplicities $w_j$ are not positive integers, then $\eta_\mathcal{L}$ is a generalized fractal string which cannot be realized as an ordinary fractal string. A concrete example of such a generalized fractal string would be the generalized Cantor string $\eta_{CS} := \sum_{j=1}^{\infty} b^j \delta_{a^j}$ for $1 < b < a$.

If $\eta$ is a generalized fractal string, then its dimension is defined as
$$D_{\eta} := \inf(\sigma\in\mathbb{R}: \int_0^{\infty} x^{-\sigma}|\eta|(dx) < \infty),$$
its counting function as

$$N_{\eta}(x) := \int_0^x \eta(dx) = \eta(0, x) +\frac12\eta(\{x\})$$
and its geometric zeta function (its Mellin transform) as

$$\zeta_{\eta}(s) := \int_0^{\infty} x^{-s}\eta(dx).$$
(Note that the counting function is normalized at jump discontinuities to be half of the value at any singletons which have nonzero measure.)

== See also ==
- Fractal sequence
