= Fractalgrid =

Concept in electric power distribution

In electric power distribution, a fractalgrid is a system-of-systems architecture of distributed energy resources or DERs. In a fractalgrid topology, multiple microgrids are strategically arranged to follow a fractal or recursive pattern. Fractals, or self-similar patterns, can be seen in nature. Clouds, river networks, and lightning bolts are a few examples of natural phenomena that display fractal features. In a fractalgrid, a microgrid may be composed of smaller microgrids or “fractal units”. In such a configuration, the network becomes one of simplified power flows and communications through distributed substations.

== Variations ==
There are two main variations of the fractalgrid concept. Though not mutually exclusive, CleanSpark's FractalGrid architecture is a bottom-up implementation while NRECA's flows from the top-down to reach similar architectural quality attributes.

=== CleanSpark's FractalGrid ===
This variation is a command-and-control platform that integrates energy storage technology with on-site generation, monitored by a distributed data monitoring and controls system. The fundamental goals of the fractalgrid are to ensure energy security to critical facilities and functions of the local area while reducing overall cost.

Features include electricity storage integration, technology-agnostic implementation, load management, demand response, peak shaving, and real-time energy optimization.

Within a fractalgrid, microgrids are placed in parent-child relationships in which a child microgrid can be islanded from its parent microgrid. Each fractal microgrid can operate autonomously or federated with others. The federated state allows for sharing of resources but also allows for disconnection in the cases of maintenance and emergencies. In the same way that microgrids are able to island from the utility when needed, fractal microgrids can disconnect from one another in order to maintain power supply to critical loads.

The fractalgrid was conceived in 2012 by Art Villanueva, CleanSpark's founding CTO and CSO and designed and implemented by Jennifer Worrall. The implementation uses recursion and bounds complexity to O(N).

==== Camp Pendleton FractalGrid Demonstration (CPFD) ====
Starting July 2014, an active fractalgrid has been active in San Diego County, California at military base Camp Pendleton, funded by the California Energy Commission to exhibit the uses of fractalgrid technology. The Camp Pendleton fractalgrid is connected to a 1.1 MW facility consisting of several buildings at the Barracks, a three-story parking garage and three cell towers. The project implements three self-sufficient fractal microgrids and a larger microgrid that interconnects the site such that resources can be shared between microgrids in various configurations. Each fractal microgrid's operational status is dependent on the state of power supply and the need to keep critical loads powered. Using real-time data, the system monitors the energy consumption levels and evaluates the power generation received from distributed energy resources (DERs). This analysis is used to determine how many loads can be powered by local generation.

The CPFD illustrates islanding within a fractalgrid. Each fractal microgrid is capable of completely separating from its parent microgrid in order to best support critical loads.

=== NRECA's Agile Fractal Grid ===
The Agile Fractal Grid is a concept envisioned by Craig Miller, scientist at the National Rural Electric Cooperative Association (NRECA), as well as Maurice Martin, David Pinney, and George Walker. According to their report, "Achieving a Resilient and Agile Grid" the ideal principles of Fractal Operation are as follows:

- All segments of the grid operate with the same information and control model - regardless of scale
- Every segment of the grid has a decision-making capability
- The means for exchange of peer-to-peer information are defined clearly in standards
- The rules for when to divide and when to combine are defined clearly

An integral part of the agile grid is segmentation. The concept calls for a collection of independently operating systems that function together in a coordinated manner, as opposed to the traditional utility grid supplying energy for a large geographical area. Units are segmented in such a way that they are able to act as individual units and localize power supply and control. A large benefit to segmentation is the ability for the individual units to act separately from a central control system, which can create more stability in the overall system and decentralizes the source of energy.

The basis for the agile grid is segmentability, rather than segmentation. It is crucial for the units to have the ability to operate separately from each other, but only when it is practical to do so. Integration between units must also occur for the system to be efficient.
