= H-closed space =

In mathematics, a Hausdorff space is said to be H-closed, or Hausdorff closed, or absolutely closed if it is closed in every Hausdorff space containing it as a subspace. This property is a generalization of compactness, since a compact subset of a Hausdorff space is closed. Thus, every compact Hausdorff space is H-closed. The notion of an H-closed space has been introduced in 1924 by P. Alexandroff and P. Urysohn.

== Examples and equivalent formulations ==
- The unit interval $[0,1]$, endowed with the smallest topology which refines the euclidean topology, and contains $Q \cap [0,1]$ as an open set is H-closed but not compact.
- Every regular Hausdorff H-closed space is compact.
- A Hausdorff space is H-closed if and only if every open cover has a finite subfamily with dense union.

== See also ==
- Compact space
