= Zero-dimensional space =

Topological space of dimension zero

In mathematics, a zero-dimensional topological space (or nil-dimensional space) is a topological space that has dimension zero with respect to one of several inequivalent notions of assigning a dimension to a given topological space. A graphical illustration of a zero-dimensional space is a point.

== Definition ==
Specifically:

- A topological space is zero-dimensional with respect to the Lebesgue covering dimension if every open cover of the space has a refinement that is a cover by disjoint open sets.
- A topological space is zero-dimensional with respect to the finite-to-finite covering dimension if every finite open cover of the space has a refinement that is a finite open cover such that any point in the space is contained in exactly one open set of this refinement.
- A topological space is zero-dimensional with respect to the small inductive dimension if it has a base consisting of clopen sets.

The three notions above agree for separable, metrisable spaces (see Inductive dimension § Relationships between dimensions).

== Properties of spaces with small inductive dimension zero ==
- A zero-dimensional Hausdorff space is necessarily totally disconnected, but the converse fails. However, a locally compact Hausdorff space is zero-dimensional if and only if it is totally disconnected. (See (Arhangel'skii & Tkachenko 2008, Proposition 3.1.7, p.136) for the non-trivial direction.)
- Zero-dimensional Polish spaces are a particularly convenient setting for descriptive set theory. Examples of such spaces include the Cantor space and Baire space.
- Hausdorff zero-dimensional spaces are precisely the subspaces of topological powers $2^I$ where $2=\{0,1\}$ is given the discrete topology. Such a space is sometimes called a Cantor cube. If I is countably infinite, $2^I$ is the Cantor space.

== Manifolds ==
All points of a zero-dimensional manifold are isolated.
