= Cantor cube =

Topological group

In mathematics, a Cantor cube is a topological group of the form {0, 1}^{A} for some index set A. Its algebraic and topological structures are the group direct product and product topology over the cyclic group of order 2 (which is itself given the discrete topology).

If A is a countably infinite set, the corresponding Cantor cube is a Cantor space. Cantor cubes are special among compact groups because every compact group is a continuous image of one, although usually not a homomorphic image. (The literature can be unclear, so for safety, assume all spaces are Hausdorff.)

Topologically, any Cantor cube is:

- homogeneous;
- compact;
- zero-dimensional;
- AE(0), an absolute extensor for compact zero-dimensional spaces. (Every map from a closed subset of such a space into a Cantor cube extends to the whole space.)

By a theorem of Schepin, these four properties characterize Cantor cubes; any space satisfying the properties is homeomorphic to a Cantor cube.

In fact, every AE(0) space is the continuous image of a Cantor cube, and with some effort one can prove that every compact group is AE(0). It follows that every zero-dimensional compact group is homeomorphic to a Cantor cube, and every compact group is a continuous image of a Cantor cube.
