= Fractal in soil mechanics =

A fractal is an irregular geometric object with an infinite nesting of structure at all scales. It is mainly applicable in soil chromatography and soil micromorphology (Anderson, 1997). Internal structure, pore size distribution and pore geometry can be identified by using fractal dimension at nano scale. As soil is heterogeneous the pore spaces are made up of macropores, micropores and mesopores. When soil is studied in nanoscale it the macropore are composed of micro and meso pore and further they are composed of organo-mineral complex.

The fractal approach to soil mechanics is a new line of thought. It was first raised in "Fractal Character Of Grain-Size Distribution Of Expansion Soils" by Yongfu Xu and Songyu Liu, published in 1999, by Fractals. There are several problems in soil mechanics which can be dealt by applying a fractal approach. One of these problems is the determination of soil-water-characteristic curve (also called (water retention curve) and/or capillary pressure curve). It is a time-consuming process considering usual laboratory experiments. Many scientists have been involved in making mathematical models of soil-water-characteristic curve (SWCC) in which constants are related to the fractal dimension of pore size distribution or particle size distribution of the soil. After Benoît Mandelbrot popularized fractals, Scientists of Agronomy, Agricultural engineering and Earth Scientists have developed more fractal-based models. All of these models have been used to extract hydraulic properties of soils and the potential capabilities of fractal mathematics to investigate mechanical properties of soils. It can be of great help for researchers in the area of unsaturated soil mechanics. Mechanical parameters can also be driven from such models and of course it needs further works and researches. Fractal calculus is a framework that includes functions with fractal support.
