= Discrete two-point space =

Discrete topological space with two points

In topology, a branch of mathematics, a discrete two-point space is the simplest example of a totally disconnected discrete space. The points can be denoted by the symbols 0 and 1.

== Properties ==
Any disconnected space has a continuous mapping which is not constant onto the discrete two-point space. Conversely if a nonconstant continuous mapping to the discrete two-point space exists from a topological space, the space is disconnected.

== See also ==
- List of topologies
