= Piers Bohl =

Latvian mathematician (1865–1921)

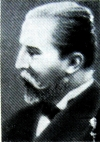
- Born: 23 October 1865; Walk, Livonia
- Died: 25 December 1921 (aged 56); Riga, Latvia
- Education: University of Tartu
- Known for: first proof of the three‑dimensional Brouwer fixed‑point theorem; quasiperiodic functions; Bohl's trinomial root‐location theorem
- Scientific career
- Fields: Mathematics

Piers Bohl (23 October 1865 – 25 December 1921) was a Latvian mathematician, who worked in differential equations, topology and quasiperiodic functions.

== Biography ==
He was born in 1865 in Walk, Livonia, in the family of a poor Baltic German merchant. In 1884, after graduating from a German school in Viljandi, he entered the faculty of physics and mathematics at the University of Tartu. In 1893 Bohl was awarded his Master's degree. This was for an investigation of quasi-periodic functions. The notion of quasi-periodic functions was generalised still further by Harald Bohr when he introduced almost periodic functions. He has been the first to prove the three-dimensional case of the Brouwer fixed-point theorem, but his work was not noticed at the time.

== Polynomial result on trinomial equations ==
In 1908, Bohl established a general theorem for locating the roots of complex trinomials of the form $P(z) = z^k + a\,z^\ell + b$, where $k$ and $\ell$ are positive integers with $k>\ell$, and $a$ and $b$ are nonzero complex numbers. Rather than relying on heavy algebraic manipulations, he employed an elementary geometric construction: by interpreting the magnitudes of the coefficients $|a|$, $|b|$ and the chosen radius (for instance, the unit circle) as the sides of a triangle, one can associate two angles that, together with the arguments of $a$ and $b$, yield explicit bounds. These bounds determine exactly how many roots lie inside the circle, either by simple inequalities when one coefficient dominates, or by counting the integers in a specific interval when all three lengths can form a triangle.

Bohl's result not only unifies numerous special‐case criteria (such as those later attributed to Schur, Cohn or Jury) but also provides direct formulas that apply regardless of the relative sizes or orientations of the coefficients. Although his work went largely unnoticed for many decades, it anticipates modern applications in the stability analysis of differential and difference equations, where knowing whether all characteristic roots lie within the unit circle is essential for determining asymptotic behaviour.
