= Alexandroff extension =

Way to extend a non-compact topological space

In the mathematical field of topology, the Alexandroff extension is a way to extend a noncompact topological space by adjoining a single point in such a way that the resulting space is compact. It is named after the Russian mathematician Pavel Alexandroff. More precisely, let X be a topological space. Then the Alexandroff extension of X is a certain compact space X* together with an open embedding c : X → X* such that the complement of X in X* consists of a single point, typically denoted ∞. The map c is a Hausdorff compactification if and only if X is a locally compact, noncompact Hausdorff space. For such spaces the Alexandroff extension is called the one-point compactification or Alexandroff compactification. The advantages of the Alexandroff compactification lie in its simple, often geometrically meaningful structure and the fact that it is in a precise sense minimal among all compactifications; the disadvantage lies in the fact that it only gives a Hausdorff compactification on the class of locally compact, noncompact Hausdorff spaces, unlike the Stone–Čech compactification which exists for any topological space (but provides an embedding exactly for Tychonoff spaces).

== Example: inverse stereographic projection ==
A geometrically appealing example of one-point compactification is given by the inverse stereographic projection. Recall that the stereographic projection S gives an explicit homeomorphism from the unit sphere minus the north pole (0,0,1) to the Euclidean plane. The inverse stereographic projection $S^{-1}: \mathbb{R}^2 \hookrightarrow S^2$ is an open, dense embedding into a compact Hausdorff space obtained by adjoining the additional point $\infty = (0,0,1)$. Under the stereographic projection latitudinal circles $z = c$ get mapped to planar circles $r = \sqrt{(1+c)/(1-c)}$. It follows that the deleted neighborhood basis of $(0,0,1)$ given by the punctured spherical caps $c \leq z < 1$ corresponds to the complements of closed planar disks $r \geq \sqrt{(1+c)/(1-c)}$. More qualitatively, a neighborhood basis at $\infty$ is furnished by the sets $S^{-1}(\mathbb{R}^2 \setminus K) \cup \{ \infty \}$ as K ranges through the compact subsets of $\mathbb{R}^2$. This example already contains the key concepts of the general case.

== Motivation ==
Let $c: X \hookrightarrow Y$ be an embedding from a topological space X to a compact Hausdorff topological space Y, with dense image and one-point remainder $\{ \infty \} = Y \setminus c(X)$. Then c(X) is open in a compact Hausdorff space so is locally compact Hausdorff, hence its homeomorphic preimage X is also locally compact Hausdorff. Moreover, if X were compact then c(X) would be closed in Y and hence not dense. Thus a space can only admit a Hausdorff one-point compactification if it is locally compact, noncompact and Hausdorff. Moreover, in such a one-point compactification the image of a neighborhood basis for x in X gives a neighborhood basis for c(x) in c(X), and—because a subset of a compact Hausdorff space is compact if and only if it is closed—the open neighborhoods of $\infty$ must be all sets obtained by adjoining $\infty$ to the image under c of a subset of X with compact complement.

== The Alexandroff extension ==
Let $X$ be a topological space. Put $X^* = X \cup \{\infty \},$ and topologize $X^*$ by taking as open sets all the open sets in X together with all sets of the form $V = (X \setminus C) \cup \{\infty \}$ where C is closed and compact in X. Here, $X \setminus C$ denotes the complement of $C$ in $X.$ Note that $V$ is an open neighborhood of $\infty,$ and thus any open cover of $\{\infty \}$ will contain all except a compact subset $C$ of $X^*,$ implying that $X^*$ is compact (Kelley 1975, p. 150).

The space $X^*$ is called the Alexandroff extension of X (Willard, 19A). Sometimes the same name is used for the inclusion map $c: X\to X^*.$

The properties below follow from the above discussion:

- The map c is continuous and open: it embeds X as an open subset of $X^*$.
- The space $X^*$ is compact.
- The image c(X) is dense in $X^*$, if X is noncompact.
- The space $X^*$ is Hausdorff if and only if X is Hausdorff and locally compact.
- The space $X^*$ is T_{1} if and only if X is T_{1}.

== The one-point compactification ==
In particular, the Alexandroff extension $c: X \rightarrow X^*$ is a Hausdorff compactification of X if and only if X is Hausdorff, noncompact and locally compact. In this case it is called the one-point compactification or Alexandroff compactification of X.

Recall from the above discussion that any Hausdorff compactification with one point remainder is necessarily (isomorphic to) the Alexandroff compactification. In particular, if $X$ is a compact Hausdorff space and $p$ is a limit point of $X$ (i.e. not an isolated point of $X$), $X$ is the Alexandroff compactification of $X\setminus\{p\}$.

Let X be any noncompact Tychonoff space. Under the natural partial ordering on the set $\mathcal{C}(X)$ of equivalence classes of compactifications, any minimal element is equivalent to the Alexandroff extension (Engelking, Theorem 3.5.12). It follows that a noncompact Tychonoff space admits a minimal compactification if and only if it is locally compact.

== Non-Hausdorff one-point compactifications ==
Let $(X,\tau)$ be an arbitrary noncompact topological space. One may want to determine all the compactifications (not necessarily Hausdorff) of $X$ obtained by adding a single point, which could also be called one-point compactifications in this context. So one wants to determine all possible ways to give $X^*=X\cup\{\infty\}$ a compact topology such that $X$ is dense in it and the subspace topology on $X$ induced from $X^*$ is the same as the original topology. The last compatibility condition on the topology automatically implies that $X$ is dense in $X^*$, because $X$ is not compact, so it cannot be closed in a compact space. Also, it is a fact that the inclusion map $c:X\to X^*$ is necessarily an open embedding, that is, $X$ must be open in $X^*$ and the topology on $X^*$ must contain every member of $\tau$. So the topology on $X^*$ is determined by the neighbourhoods of $\infty$. Any neighborhood of $\infty$ is necessarily the complement in $X^*$ of a closed compact subset of $X$, as previously discussed.

The topologies on $X^*$ that make it a compactification of $X$ are as follows:

- The Alexandroff extension of $X$ defined above. Here we take the complements of all closed compact subsets of $X$ as neighborhoods of $\infty$. This is the largest topology that makes $X^*$ a one-point compactification of $X$.
- The open extension topology. Here we add a single neighborhood of $\infty$, namely the whole space $X^*$. This is the smallest topology that makes $X^*$ a one-point compactification of $X$.
- Any topology intermediate between the two topologies above. For neighborhoods of $\infty$ one has to pick a suitable subfamily of the complements of all closed compact subsets of $X$; for example, the complements of all finite closed compact subsets, or the complements of all countable closed compact subsets.

== Further examples ==
=== Compactifications of discrete spaces ===
- The one-point compactification of the set of positive integers is homeomorphic to the space consisting of K = {0} U {1/n | n is a positive integer} with the order topology.
- A sequence $\{a_n\}$ in a topological space $X$ converges to a point $a$ in $X$, if and only if the map $f\colon\mathbb N^*\to X$ given by $f(n) = a_n$ for $n$ in $\mathbb N$ and $f(\infty) = a$ is continuous. Here $\mathbb N$ has the discrete topology.
- Polyadic spaces are defined as topological spaces that are the continuous image of the power of a one-point compactification of a discrete, locally compact Hausdorff space.

=== Compactifications of continuous spaces ===
- The one-point compactification of n-dimensional Euclidean space R^{n} is homeomorphic to the n-sphere S^{n}. As above, the map can be given explicitly as an n-dimensional inverse stereographic projection.
- The one-point compactification of the product of $\kappa$ copies of the half-closed interval [0,1), that is, of $[0,1)^\kappa$, is (homeomorphic to) $[0,1]^\kappa$.
- Since the closure of a connected subset is connected, the Alexandroff extension of a noncompact connected space is connected. However a one-point compactification may "connect" a disconnected space: for instance the one-point compactification of the disjoint union of a finite number $n$ of copies of the interval (0,1) is a wedge of $n$ circles.
- The one-point compactification of the disjoint union of a countable number of copies of the interval (0,1) is the Hawaiian earring. This is different from the wedge of countably many circles, which is not compact.
- Given $X$ compact Hausdorff and $C$ any closed subset of $X$, the one-point compactification of $X\setminus C$ is $X/C$, where the forward slash denotes the quotient space.
- If $X$ and $Y$ are locally compact Hausdorff, then $(X\times Y)^* = X^* \wedge Y^*$ where $\wedge$ is the smash product. Recall that the definition of the smash product:$A\wedge B = (A \times B) / (A \vee B)$ where $A \vee B$ is the wedge sum, and again, / denotes the quotient space.

=== As a functor ===
The Alexandroff extension can be viewed as a functor from the category of topological spaces with proper continuous maps as morphisms to the category whose objects are continuous maps $c\colon X \rightarrow Y$ and for which the morphisms from $c_1\colon X_1 \rightarrow Y_1$ to $c_2\colon X_2 \rightarrow Y_2$ are pairs of continuous maps $f_X\colon X_1 \rightarrow X_2, \ f_Y\colon Y_1 \rightarrow Y_2$ such that $f_Y \circ c_1 = c_2 \circ f_X$. In particular, homeomorphic spaces have isomorphic Alexandroff extensions. The latter is the arrow category of topological spaces, often constructed as category of functors from interval category $\operatorname{Arr}(\mathrm{Top}) = \operatorname{Func}(\mathrm{I}, \mathrm{Top})$, where interval category is the category with 2 objects connected by single arrow.

== See also ==
- Bohr compactification
- Compact space – Type of mathematical space
- Compactification (mathematics) – Embedding a topological space into a compact space as a dense subset
- End (topology)
- Extended real number line – Real numbers with + and - infinity added
- Normal space – Type of topological space
- Pointed set – Basic concept in set theory
- Riemann sphere – Model of the extended complex plane plus a point at infinity
- Stereographic projection – Particular mapping that projects a sphere onto a plane
- Stone–Čech compactification – Concept in topology
- Wallman compactification – A compactification of T_{1} topological spaces
