= PKS 0736+017 =

Quasar in the constellation Canis Minor

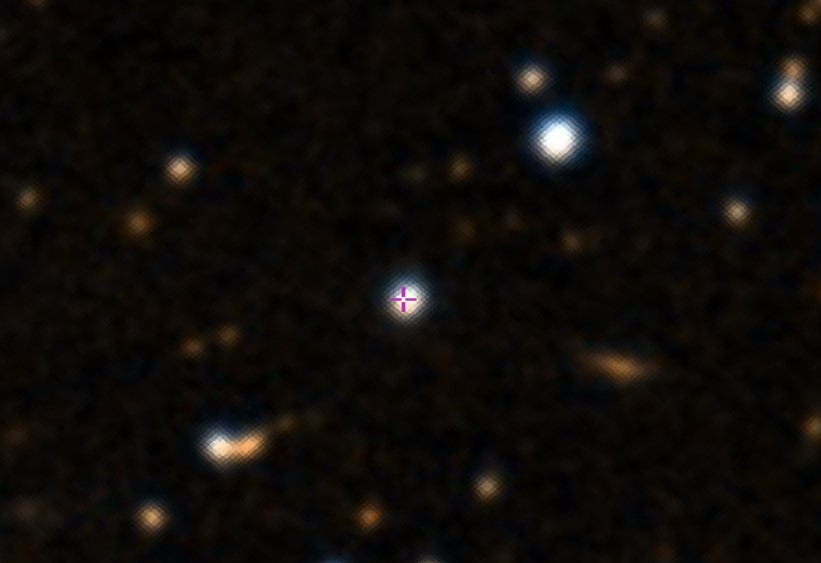
- The quasar PKS 0736+017.

Observation data (J2000.0 epoch)
- Constellation: Canis Minor
- Right ascension: 07^{h} 39^{m} 18.033^{s}
- Declination: +01° 37′ 04.618″
- Redshift: 0.189410
- Heliocentric radial velocity: 56,784 km/s
- Distance: 2.453 Gly (752.09 Mpc)
- Apparent magnitude (V): 16.47
- Apparent magnitude (B): 16.9

Characteristics
- Type: FRSQ

Other designations
- 3FGL J0739.4+0137, LEDA 2825203, PKS 0736+01, 4FGL J0739.2+0137, QSO B0736+017

PKS 0736+017 is a blazar located in the constellation of Canis Minor. This object is also a highly polarized compact radio quasar. Its source having a radio spectrum, appears to be flat, making it a flat-spectrum radio quasar. It has a redshift of (z) 0.189 and is hosted in a large elliptical galaxy with a half light radius measurement of r_{e} = 13 kiloparsecs. The black hole mass in PKS 0736+017 is 7.32^{+0.89}_{-0.91} × 10^{7} M_{☉} based on a full width at half maximum (FWHM) scaling factor and virial relation.

PKS 0736+017 is found violent variable across its electromagnetic spectrum. It showed an outburst in December 2001 where its brightness level reached a maximum of 14.90 in the B band, 13.79 in the R band and 14.34 in the V band. The spectral slope remained constant while brightness level showed a sharp decrease by 0.3 magnitude during 4.5 hours.

In 2002, PKS 0736+017 exhibited multiple variability behaviors. During most nights, the quasar was in an optical faint state displaying fluctuations on a small-scale. When observed during three nights, it became more variable and brighter. In its active state, PKS 0736+017 showed a rapid flare followed by quasi-periodic low-amplitude variations. Accompanied by the flare, were complex oscillations that soon continued and clearly shown once the quasar reached its high state. One week later, another flare was observed although not rapid as the first. During the quasar's brighten state, its color variation became redder.

In February 2015, the High Energy Stereoscopic System in Namibia, detected high-energy emission from PKS 0736+017 indicating the presence of a gamma ray flare. Prior in 2014, a near-infrared flare was seen in the quasar. In 2023, renewed gamma ray activity was detected by Large Area Telescope.

The optical domain of PKS 0736+017 shows strong forbidden and permitted emission lines. Not to mention, its broad hydrogen emission lines are known to show significant disparities. Between 1978 and 1980, the H-beta line intensity in PKS 0736+017 decreased by 40 percent, with it increasing by 50 percent between 1985 and 1986. As for its H-gamma line intensity, a large fractional change is seen. In additional, its visible spectrum is found identical to 3C 273, which both quasars have iron, hydrogen and helium permitted lines but no forbidden lines.
