= Vague torus =

In classical mechanics, a vague torus is a region in phase space that is characterized by approximate constants of motion, as opposed to an actual torus defined by exact constants of motion. The concept of vague tori is used to describe regular (quasiperiodic) segments of otherwise chaotic trajectories.
