= Polyadic space =

Type of topological space

In mathematics, a polyadic space is a topological space that is the image under a continuous function of a topological power of an Alexandroff one-point compactification of a discrete space.

== History ==
Polyadic spaces were first studied by S. Mrówka in 1970 as a generalisation of dyadic spaces. The theory was developed further by R. H. Marty, János Gerlits and Murray G. Bell, the latter of whom introduced the concept of the more general centred spaces.

== Background ==
A subset K of a topological space X is said to be compact if every open cover of K contains a finite subcover. It is said to be locally compact at a point x ∈ X if x lies in the interior of some compact subset of X. X is a locally compact space if it is locally compact at every point in the space.

A proper subset A ⊂ X is said to be dense if the closure Ā = X. A space whose set has a countable, dense subset is called a separable space.

For a non-compact, locally compact Hausdorff topological space $(X, \tau_X)$, we define the Alexandroff one-point compactification as the topological space with the set $\left \{ \omega \right \} \cup X$, denoted $\omega X$, where $\omega \notin X$, with the topology $\tau_{\omega X}$ defined as follows:

- $\tau_X \subseteq \tau_{\omega X}$
- $X \setminus C \cup \left \{ \omega \right \} \in \tau_{\omega X}$, for every compact subset $C \subseteq X$.

== Definition ==
Let $X$ be a discrete topological space, and let $\omega X$ be an Alexandroff one-point compactification of $X$. A Hausdorff space $P$ is polyadic if for some cardinal number $\lambda$, there exists a continuous surjective function $f : \omega X^\lambda \rightarrow P$, where $\omega X^\lambda$ is the product space obtained by multiplying $\omega X$ with itself $\lambda$ times.

== Examples ==
Take the set of natural numbers $\mathbb{Z}^+$ with the discrete topology. Its Alexandroff one-point compactification is $\omega \mathbb{Z}^+$. Choose $\lambda = 1$ and define the homeomorphism $h : \omega \mathbb{Z}^+ \rightarrow \left [ 0,1 \right ]$ with the mapping
$$h(x) =
\begin{cases}
1/x, & \text{if }x\in\mathbb{Z}+ \\
0, & \text{if }x=\omega
\end{cases}$$
It follows from the definition that the image space $h[\omega\mathbb Z] = \left \{0 \right \} \cup \left \{ 1/n \,:\, n \in \mathbb N \right \}$ is polyadic and compact directly from the definition of compactness, without using Heine-Borel.

Every dyadic space (a compact space which is a continuous image of a Cantor set) is a polyadic space.

Let X be a separable, compact space. If X is a metrizable space, then it is polyadic (the converse is also true).

== Properties ==
The cellularity $c(X)$ of a space $X$ is
$$c(X) = \sup \left \{ \vert B \vert : B \text{ is a disjoint collection of open sets of } X \right \}$$

The tightness $t(X)$ of a space $X$ is defined as follows: let $A \subseteq X$, and $p \in \bar{A}$. Define
$$a(p, A) := \min \left \{ \vert  B \vert : p \in \mathrm{cl}_X (B), B \subseteq A \right \}$$
$$t(p, X) := \sup \left \{ a(p, A) : A \subseteq X, p \in \mathrm{cl}_X(A) \right \}$$
Then $t(X) := \sup \left \{ t(p, X) : p \in X \right \}.$

The topological weight $w(X)$ of a polyadic space $X$ satisfies the equality $w(X) = c(X) \cdot t(X)$.

Let $X$ be a polyadic space, and let $A \subseteq X$. Then there exists a polyadic space $P \subseteq X$ such that $A \subseteq P$ and $c(P) \le c(A)$.

Polyadic spaces are the smallest class of topological spaces that contain metric compact spaces and are closed under products and continuous images. Every polyadic space $X$ of weight $\leq 2^\omega$ is a continuous image of $\mathbb{Z}^+$.

A topological space $X$ has the Suslin property if there is no uncountable family of pairwise disjoint non-empty open subsets of $X$. Suppose that $X$ has the Suslin property and is polyadic. Then $X$ is dyadic.

Let $\mathrm{dis}(X)$ be the least number of discrete sets needed to cover $X$, and let $\Delta (X)$ denote the least cardinality of a non-empty open set in $X$. If $X$ is a polyadic space, then $\mathrm{dis}(X) \ge \Delta (X)$.

=== Ramsey's theorem ===
There is an analogue of Ramsey's theorem from combinatorics for polyadic spaces. For this, we describe the relationship between Boolean spaces and polyadic spaces. Let $CO(X)$ denote the clopen algebra of all clopen subsets of $X$. We define a Boolean space as a compact Hausdorff space whose basis is $CO(X)$. The element $G \in CO(X)'$ such that $\langle\langle G \rangle\rangle = CO(X)$ is called the generating set for $CO(X)$. We say $G$ is a $(\tau, \kappa)$-disjoint collection if $G$ is the union of at most $\tau$ subcollections $G_\alpha$, where for each $\alpha$, $G_\alpha$ is a disjoint collection of cardinality at most $\kappa$ It was proven by Petr Simon that $X$ is a Boolean space with the generating set $G$ of $CO(X)$ being $(\tau, \kappa)$-disjoint if and only if $X$ is homeomorphic to a closed subspace of $\alpha \kappa ^ \tau$. The Ramsey-like property for polyadic spaces as stated by Murray Bell for Boolean spaces is then as follows: every uncountable clopen collection contains an uncountable subcollection which is either linked or disjoint.

=== Compactness ===
We define the compactness number of a space $X$, denoted by $\mathrm{cmpn}(X)$, to be the least number $n$ such that $X$ has an n-ary closed subbase. We can construct polyadic spaces with arbitrary compactness number. We will demonstrate this using two theorems proven by Murray Bell in 1985. Let $\mathcal{S}$ be a collection of sets and let $S$ be a set. We denote the set $\left\{\bigcap \mathcal{F} : \mathcal{F} \text{ is a finite subset of } \mathcal{S}\right\}$ by $\mathcal{S}^{\widehat{\mathcal{F}}}$; all subsets of $S$ of size $n$ by $[S]^n$; and all subsets of size at most $n$ by $[S]^{\leq n}$. If $2 \leq n < \omega$ and $\bigcap \mathcal{F} \ne \empty$ for all $\mathcal{F} \in [\mathcal{S}]^n$, then we say that $\mathcal{S}$ is n-linked. If every n-linked subset of $\mathcal{S}$ has a non-empty intersection, then we say that $\mathcal{S}$ is n-ary. Note that if $\mathcal{S}$ is n-ary, then so is $\mathcal{S}^{\widehat{\mathcal{F}}}$, and therefore every space $X$ with $\mathrm{cmpn}(X) \leq n$ has a closed, n-ary subbase $\mathcal{S}$ with $\mathcal{S} = \mathcal{S}^{\widehat{\mathcal{F}}}$. Note that a collection $\mathcal{S} = \mathcal{S}^{\widehat{\mathcal{F}}}$ of closed subsets of a compact space $X$ is a closed subbase if and only if for every closed $K$ in an open set $U$, there exists a finite $\mathcal{F}$ such that $\mathcal{F} \subset \mathcal{S}$ and $K \subset \bigcup \mathcal{F} \subset U$.

Let $S$ be an infinite set and let $n$ by a number such that $1 \leq n < \omega$. We define the product topology on $[S]^{\leq n}$ as follows: for $s \in S$, let $s^- = \{F \in [S]^{\leq n} : s \in F\}$, and let $s^+ = \{F \in [S]^{\leq n} : s \notin F\}$. Let $\mathcal{S}$ be the collection $\mathcal{S} = \bigcup_{s \in S} \{s^+, s^-\}$. We take $\mathcal{S}$ as a clopen subbase for our topology on $[S]^{\leq n}$. This topology is compact and Hausdorff. For $k$ and $n$ such that $0 \le k \leq n$, we have that $[S]^k$ is a discrete subspace of $[S]^{\leq n}$, and hence that $[S]^{\leq n}$ is a union of $n+1$ discrete subspaces.

Theorem (Upper bound on $\mathrm{cmpn}\left([S]^{\leq n}\right)$): For each total order $<$ on $S$, there is an $n+1$-ary closed subbase $\mathcal{R}$ of $[S]^{\leq 2n}$.

Proof: For $s \in S$, define $L_s = \{ F \in s^+ : | \{ t \in F : t < s \} | \leq n - 1 \}$ and $R_s = \{ F \in s^+ : | \{ t \in F : t > s \} | \leq n - 1 \}$. Set $\mathcal{R} = \bigcup_{ s \in S} \{ L_s, R_s, s^+ \}$. For $A$, $B$ and $C$ such that $A \cup B \cup C \ne \empty$, let $\mathcal{F} = \{ L_s : s \in A \} \cup \{ R_s : s \in B \} \cup \{ s^- : s \in C \}$ such that $\mathcal{F}$ is an $n+1$-linked subset of $\mathcal{R}$. Show that $A \cup B \in \bigcap \mathcal{F}$. $\blacksquare$

For a topological space $X$ and a subspace $A \in X$, we say that a continuous function $r : X \rightarrow A$ is a retraction if $r|_A$ is the identity map on $A$. We say that $A$ is a retract of $X$. If there exists an open set $U$ such that $A \subset U \subset X$, and $A$ is a retract of $U$, then we say that $A$ is a neighbourhood retract of $X$.

Theorem (Lower bound on $\mathrm{cmpn}\left([S]^{\le n}\right)$) Let $n$ be such that $2 \leq n < \omega$. Then $[\omega_1]^{\leq 2n-1}$ cannot be embedded as a neighbourhood retract in any space $K$ with $\mathrm{cmpn}(K) \leq n$.

From the two theorems above, it can be deduced that for $n$ such that $1 \leq n < \omega$, we have that $\mathrm{cmpn}\left([\omega_1]^{\leq 2n-1}\right) = n + 1 = \mathrm{cmpn}\left([\omega_1]^{\leq 2n}\right)$.

Let $A$ be the Alexandroff one-point compactification of the discrete space $S$, so that $A = S \cup \{\infty\}$. We define the continuous surjection $g : A^n \rightarrow [S]^{\leq n}$ by $g((x_1, ..., x_n)) = \{x_1, \ldots , x_n\} \cap S$. It follows that $[S]^{\leq n}$ is a polyadic space. Hence $[\omega_1]^{\leq 2n-1}$ is a polyadic space with compactness number $\mathrm{cmpn}\left([\omega_1]^{\leq 2n-1}\right) = n+1$.

== Generalisations ==
Centred spaces, AD-compact spaces and ξ-adic spaces are generalisations of polyadic spaces.

=== Centred space ===
Let $\mathcal{S}$ be a collection of sets. We say that $\mathcal{S}$ is centred if $\bigcap \mathcal{F} \ne \empty$ for all finite subsets $\mathcal{F} \subseteq \mathcal{S}$. Define the Boolean space $Cen( \mathcal{S} ) = \{ \chi_T : T \text{ is a centred subcollection of } \mathcal{S} \}$, with the subspace topology from $2^{\mathcal{S}}$. We say that a space $X$ is a centred space if there exists a collection $\mathcal{S}$ such that $X$ is a continuous image of $Cen(\mathcal{S})$.

Centred spaces were introduced by Murray Bell in 2004.

=== AD-compact space ===
Let $X$ be a non-empty set, and consider a family of its subsets $\mathcal{A} \subseteq \mathcal{P} (X)$. We say that $\mathcal{A}$ is an adequate family if:

- $A \in \mathcal{A} \land B \subseteq \mathcal{A} \Rightarrow B \in \mathcal{A}$
- given $A \subseteq X$, if every finite subset of $A$ is in $\mathcal{A}$, then $A \in \mathcal{A}$.

We may treat $\mathcal{A}$ as a topological space by considering it a subset of the Cantor cube $D^X$, and in this case, we denote it $K(\mathcal{A})$.

Let $K$ be a compact space. If there exist a set $X$ and an adequate family $\mathcal{A} \subseteq \mathcal{P} (X)$, such that $K$ is the continuous image of $K(\mathcal{A})$, then we say that $K$ is an AD-compact space.

AD-compact spaces were introduced by Grzegorz Plebanek. He proved that they are closed under arbitrary products and Alexandroff compactifications of disjoint unions. It follows that every polyadic space is hence an AD-compact space. The converse is not true, as there are AD-compact spaces that are not polyadic.

=== ξ-adic space ===
Let $\kappa$ and $\tau$ be cardinals, and let $X$ be a Hausdorff space. If there exists a continuous surjection from $(\kappa + 1)^\tau$ to $X$, then $X$ is said to be a ξ-adic space.

ξ-adic spaces were proposed by S. Mrówka, and the following results about them were given by János Gerlits (they also apply to polyadic spaces, as they are a special case of ξ-adic spaces).

Let $\mathfrak{n}$ be an infinite cardinal, and let $X$ be a topological space. We say that $X$ has the property $\mathbf{B} ( \mathfrak{n} )$ if for any family $\{ G_\alpha : \alpha \in A \}$ of non-empty open subsets of $X$, where $| A | = \mathfrak{n}$, we can find a set $B \subset A$ and a point $p \in X$ such that $|B| = \mathfrak{n}$ and for each neighbourhood $N$ of $p$, we have that $| \{ \beta \in B : N \cap G_\beta = \empty \} | < \mathfrak{n}$.

If $X$ is a ξ-adic space, then $X$ has the property $\mathbf{B} ( \mathfrak{n} )$ for each infinite cardinal $\mathfrak{n}$. It follows from this result that no infinite ξ-adic Hausdorff space can be an extremally disconnected space.

=== Hyadic space ===
Hyadic spaces were introduced by Eric van Douwen. They are defined as follows.

Let $X$ be a Hausdorff space. We denote by $H(X)$ the hyperspace of $X$. We define the subspace $J_2 (X)$ of $H(X)$ by $\{ F \in H(X) : |F| \le 2 \}$. A base of $H(X)$ is the family of all sets of the form $\langle U_0, \dots , U_n \rangle = \{ F \in H(X) : F \subseteq U_0 \cup \dots \cup U_n, F \cap U_i \ne \empty \text{ for } 0 \le i \le n \}$, where $n$ is any integer, and $U_i$ are open in $X$. If $X$ is compact, then we say a Hausdorff space $Y$ is hyadic if there exists a continuous surjection from $H(X)$ to $Y$.

Polyadic spaces are hyadic.

== See also ==
- Dyadic space
- Eberlein compactum
- Stone space
- Stone–Čech compactification
- Supercompact space
