= Esenin-Volpin's theorem =

Theorem in topology

In mathematics, Esenin-Volpin's theorem states that weight of an infinite compact dyadic space is the supremum of the weights of its points. It was introduced by Alexander Esenin-Volpin (1949). It was generalized by Efimov in 1965 and Turzański in 1992.
