= PKS 0048−097 =

BL Lacertae object located in the constellation of Cetus

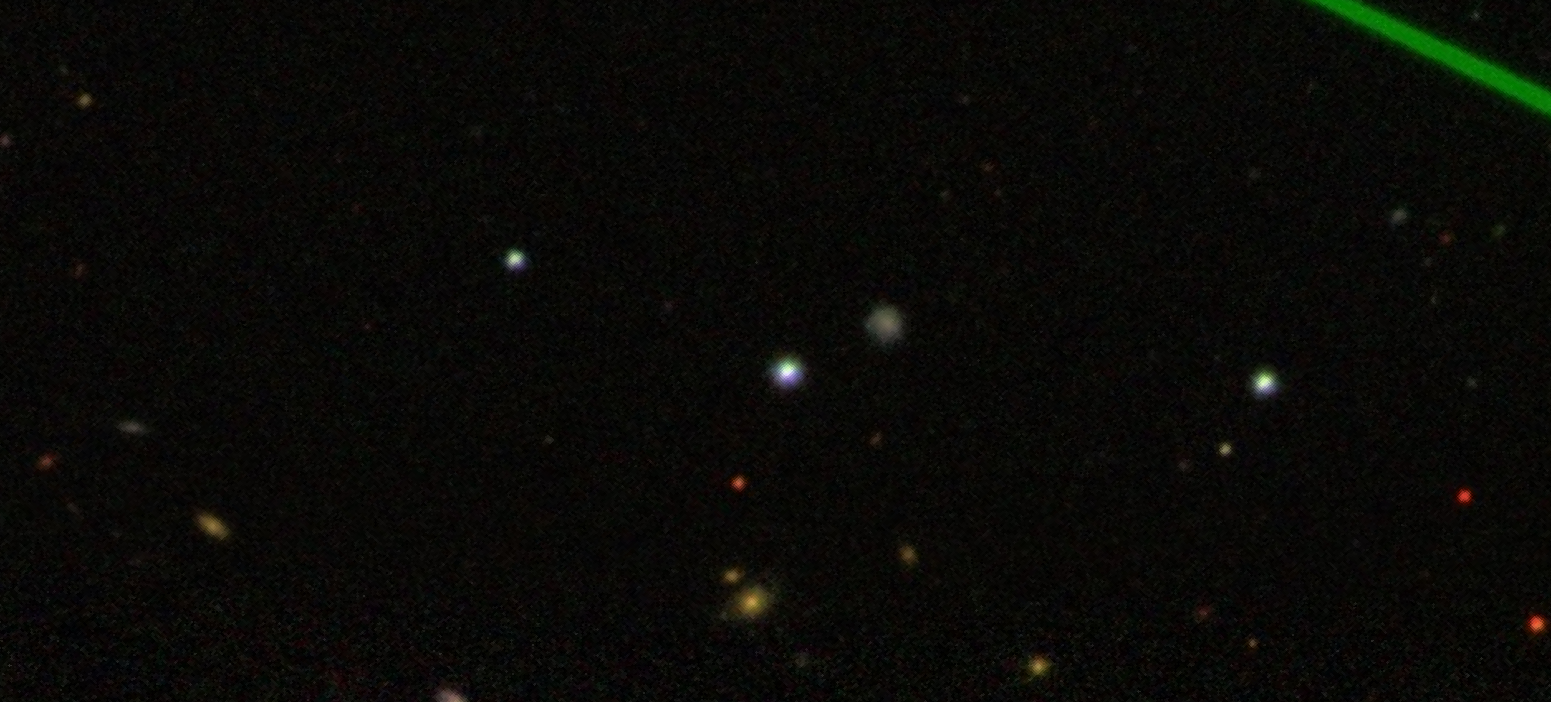
- SDSS image of PKS 0048−097

Observation data (J2000.0 epoch)
- Constellation: Cetus
- Right ascension: 00^{h} 50^{m} 41.311^{s}
- Declination: −09° 29′ 05.210″
- Redshift: 0.634000
- Heliocentric radial velocity: 190,068 km/s
- Distance: 6.073 Gly
- Apparent magnitude (V): 16.22
- Apparent magnitude (B): 16.39

Characteristics
- Type: Opt.var. BLLAC

Other designations
- 6dF J0050413−092905, 2MASS J00504130−0929051, LEDA 2822375, OB −080, NVSS J005041−092906, PHL 0856, WMAP 077, VLSS J0050.6−0929, SDSS J005041.30−092905.1, FBQS J0050−0929, MRC 0048−097

PKS 0048−097 is a BL Lacertae object located in the western region of the constellation Cetus. The redshift of the object is (z) 0.635 based on measurement of emission lines, estimating it to be 6 billion light-years from Earth. It was first discovered by astronomers during the Parkes Observatory radio sources survey in 1966. The source is known to be variable based on its flux density and is located northeast from NGC 246, a planetary nebula.

== Description ==
PKS 0048−097 is optically violently variable. When observed during photometric monitoring on January 18, 2001, the source fluctuated in brightness, increasing by 0.38 magnitudes within 45 minutes then decreasing its brightness before increasing once more. In addition, the object has displayed several flaring periods with a large optical outburst occurring in June 2009. It was noted to be in a moderate high optical state of 15.5 magnitudes with its energy distribution estimated to be from 10^{14} reaching up to 2.5 × 10^{15} Hz. Long-term variations were observed via optical wavelengths of almost 3 magnitudes with a flickering period of 8 magnitude less than one week. A near-infrared flaring period was detected in January 2011.

The radio structure of PKS 0048−097 is compact. Based on observations, the source displays a radio spectrum with a turnover frequency at 10 GHz but becomes inverted to 22 GHz when its activity becomes minimum. Imaging by Very Long Baseline Interferometry showed there is a jet towards the southeast direction with a position angle of 165°, a polarized jet component and a weakly polarized radio core. Extended radio emission from the core is seen in the center of both a possible hotspot and a diffused structure. Very Large Array observations found an extended secondary component holding a flux density of 0.05 ± 0.01 Jansky.

PKS 0048−097 is classified as a polarization rotator. It has polarization variations occurring at the time scale of five years, which in turn, are associated with a component described as slow varying opposed to outbursts on short time scales. The polarization position angle is also noted as stable at 90° ± 1.5° without any signs of major amplitude changes in this eight year observation period. A rotation of 260° was reported, beginning before the outburst in 1974-75 and ending as soon the outburst reached a peak of 8 GHz. Further observations detected its spectrum elevating at all frequencies suggesting the outburst was broadband.

The host galaxy of PKS 0048−097 is undetected, but is assumed to be an elliptical galaxy. It has a faint companion located 2.5 arcseconds east from its nucleus appearing as both resolved and associated together with the source based on imaging.

A quasi-periodicity modulation was found for PKS 0048−097. Based on light curve data observations, the periodicity is estimated between 350 and 600 days. The structure is also known to vary dramatically with its jet direction shifting in position angle from -160° south-westwards to +160° south-eastwards.
