= Bohr compactification =

In mathematics, the Bohr compactification of a topological group G is a compact Hausdorff topological group H that may be canonically associated to G. Its importance lies in the reduction of the theory of uniformly almost periodic functions on G to the theory of continuous functions on H. The concept is named after Harald Bohr who pioneered the study of almost periodic functions, on the real line.

== Definitions and basic properties ==
Given a topological group G, the Bohr compactification of G is a compact Hausdorff topological group Bohr(G) and a continuous homomorphism

b: G → Bohr(G)

which is universal with respect to homomorphisms into compact Hausdorff groups; this means that if K is another compact Hausdorff topological group and

f: G → K

is a continuous homomorphism, then there is a unique continuous homomorphism

Bohr(f): Bohr(G) → K

such that f = Bohr(f) $\circ$ b.

Theorem. The Bohr compactification exists and is unique up to isomorphism.

We will denote the Bohr compactification of G by Bohr(G) and the canonical map by

$$\mathbf{b}: G \rightarrow \mathbf{Bohr}(G).$$

The correspondence G ↦ Bohr(G) defines a covariant functor on the category of topological groups and continuous homomorphisms.

The Bohr compactification is intimately connected to the finite-dimensional unitary representation theory of a topological group. The kernel of b consists exactly of those elements of G which cannot be separated from the identity of G by finite-dimensional unitary representations.

The Bohr compactification also reduces many problems in the theory of almost periodic functions on topological groups to that of functions on compact groups.

A bounded continuous complex-valued function f on a topological group G is uniformly almost periodic if and only if the set of right translates _{g}f where

$$[{}_g f ] (x)  = f(g^{-1} \cdot x)$$

is relatively compact in the uniform topology as g varies through G.

Theorem. A bounded continuous complex-valued function f on G is uniformly almost periodic if and only if there is a continuous function f_{1} on Bohr(G) (which is uniquely determined) such that

$f = f_1 \circ \mathbf{b}.$

== Maximally almost periodic groups ==
Topological groups for which the Bohr compactification mapping is injective are called maximally almost periodic (or MAP groups). For example all Abelian groups, all compact groups, and all free groups are MAP. In the case G is a locally compact connected group, MAP groups are completely characterized: They are precisely products of compact groups with vector groups of finite dimension.

== See also ==
- Compact space – Type of mathematical space
- Compactification (mathematics) – Embedding a topological space into a compact space as a dense subset
- Pointed set – Basic concept in set theory
- Stone–Čech compactification – Concept in topology
- Wallman compactification – A compactification of T_{1} topological spaces
