= Quasiperiodicity =

Mathematical notion of recurrence with unpredictable period

Quasiperiodicity is the property of a system that displays irregular periodicity. Periodic behavior is defined as recurring at regular intervals, such as "every 24 hours". Quasiperiodic behavior is almost but not quite periodic. The term is used to denote oscillations that appear to follow a regular pattern but which do not have a fixed period. The term thus used does not have a precise definition and should not be confused with more strictly defined mathematical concepts such as an almost periodic function or a quasiperiodic function.

== Climatology ==
Climate oscillations that appear to follow a regular pattern but which do not have a fixed period are called quasiperiodic.

Within a dynamical system such as the ocean-atmosphere system, oscillations may occur regularly when they are forced by a regular external forcing: for example, the familiar winter-summer cycle is forced by variations in sunlight from the (very close to perfectly) periodic motion of the Earth around the Sun. Or, like the recent ice age cycles, they may be less regular but still locked by external forcing. However, when the system contains the potential for an oscillation, but there is no strong external forcing to be phase-locked to, the "period" is likely to be irregular.

The canonical example of quasiperiodicity in climatology is El Niño–Southern Oscillation (ENSO). ENSO is highly consequential for wheat cultivation in Australia. Models to predict and thereby assist adaptation to ENSO have a large potential benefit to Australian wheat farmers. In the modern era, it has a "period" somewhere between four and twelve years and a peak spectral density around five years.

== See also ==
- Nonlinear resonance
- Quasiperiodic function
- Quasiperiodic motion
- Quasi-periodic oscillations
- Quasiperiodic tiling
- Seasonality
