= Quasiperiodic motion =

Type of motion that is approximately periodic

In mathematics and theoretical physics, quasiperiodic motion is motion on a torus that never comes back to the same point. This behavior can also be called quasiperiodic evolution, dynamics, or flow. The torus may be a generalized torus so that the neighborhood of any point is more than two-dimensional. At each point of the torus there is a direction of motion that remains on the torus. Once a flow on a torus is defined or fixed, it determines trajectories. If the trajectories come back to a given point after a certain time then the motion is periodic with that period, otherwise it is quasiperiodic.

The quasiperiodic motion is characterized by a finite set of frequencies which can be thought of as the frequencies at which the motion goes around the torus in different directions. For instance, if the torus is the surface of a doughnut, then there is the frequency at which the motion goes around the doughnut and the frequency at which it goes inside and out. But the set of frequencies is not unique – by redefining the way position on the torus is parametrized another set of the same size can be generated. These frequencies will be integer combinations of the former frequencies (in such a way that the backward transformation is also an integer combination). To be quasiperiodic, the ratios of the frequencies must be irrational numbers.

In Hamiltonian mechanics with n position variables and associated rates of change it is sometimes possible to find a set of n conserved quantities. This is called the fully integrable case. One then has new position variables called action-angle coordinates, one for each conserved quantity, and these action angles simply increase linearly with time. This gives motion on "level sets" of the conserved quantities, resulting in a torus that is an n-manifold – locally having the topology of n-dimensional space. The concept is closely connected to the basic facts about linear flow on the torus. These essentially linear systems and their behaviour under perturbation play a significant role in the general theory of non-linear dynamic systems. Quasiperiodic motion does not exhibit the butterfly effect characteristic of chaotic systems. In other words, starting from a slightly different initial point on the torus results in a trajectory that is always just slightly different from the original trajectory, rather than the deviation becoming large.

== Rectilinear motion ==
Rectilinear motion along a line in a Euclidean space gives rise to a quasiperiodic motion if the space is turned into a torus (a compact space) by making every point equivalent to any other point situated in the same way with respect to the integer lattice (the points with integer coordinates), so long as the direction cosines of the rectilinear motion form irrational ratios. When the dimension is 2, this means the direction cosines are incommensurable. In higher dimensions it means the direction cosines must be linearly independent over the field of rational numbers.

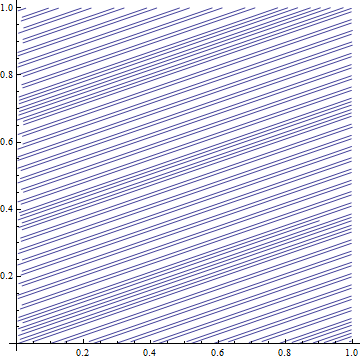
Part of a quasiperiodic motion on the 2-torus (as unit square)

== Torus model ==
If we imagine that the phase space is modelled by a torus T (that is, the variables are periodic, like angles), the trajectory of the quasiperiodic system is modelled by a curve on T that wraps around the torus without ever exactly coming back on itself. Assuming the dimension of T is at least two, these can be thought of as one-parameter subgroups of the torus given group structure (by specifying a certain point as the identity element).

== Quasiperiodic functions ==
A quasiperiodic motion can be expressed as a function of time whose value is a vector of "quasiperiodic functions". A quasiperiodic function f on the real line is a function obtained from a function F on a standard torus T (defined by n angles), by means of a trajectory in the torus in which each angle increases at a constant rate. There are n "internal frequencies", being the rates at which the n angles progress, but as mentioned above the set is not uniquely determined. In many cases the function in the torus can be expressed as a multiple Fourier series. For n equal to 2, this is
$$F(\theta_1, \theta_2) = \sum_{j=-\infty}^\infty \sum_{k=-\infty}^\infty C_{jk} \exp(ij\theta_1) \exp(ik\theta_2).$$
If the trajectory is
$$\begin{align}
\theta_1 &= a_1 + \omega_1t, \\
\theta_2 &= a_2 + \omega_2t,
\end{align}$$
then the quasiperiodic function is
$$f(t) = \sum_{j=-\infty}^\infty \sum_{k=-\infty}^\infty C_{jk} \exp[ija_1 + ika_2 + i(j\omega_1 + k\omega_2)t].$$

This shows that there may be an infinite number of frequencies in the expansion, not multiples of a finite number of frequencies. Depending on which coefficients $C_{jk}$ are non-zero, the "internal frequencies" $\omega_1$ and $\omega_2$ themselves may not contribute terms in this expansion, even if one uses an alternative set of internal frequencies such as $\omega_1$ and $\omega_1 + \omega_2.$ (Note: For instance, if only $C_{1,2},$ $C_{2,1},$ and $C_{2,2}$ are non-zero.) If the $C_{jk}$ are non-zero only when the ratio $i/j$ is some specific constant, then the function is actually periodic rather than quasiperiodic.

See Kronecker's theorem for the geometric and Fourier theory attached to the number of modes. The closure of (the image of) any one-parameter subgroup in T is a subtorus of some dimension d. In that subtorus the result of Kronecker applies: there are d real numbers, linearly independent over the rational numbers, that are the corresponding frequencies.

In the quasiperiodic case, where the image is dense, a result can be proved on the ergodicity of the motion: for any measurable subset A of T (for the usual probability measure), the average proportion of time spent by the motion in A is equal to the measure of A.

== Terminology and history ==
The theory of almost periodic functions is, roughly speaking, for the same situation but allowing T to be a torus with an infinite number of dimensions. The early discussion of quasi-periodic functions, by Ernest Esclangon following the work of Piers Bohl, in fact led to a definition of almost-periodic function, the terminology of Harald Bohr. Ian Stewart wrote that the default position of classical celestial mechanics, at this period, was that motions that could be described as quasiperiodic were the most complex that occurred. For the Solar System, that would apparently be the case if the gravitational attractions of the planets to each other could be neglected: but that assumption turned out to be the starting point of complex mathematics. The research direction begun by Andrei Kolmogorov in the 1950s led to the understanding that quasiperiodic flow on phase space tori could survive perturbation.

NB: The concept of quasiperiodic function, for example the sense in which theta functions and the Weierstrass zeta function in complex analysis are said to have quasi-periods with respect to a period lattice, is something distinct from this topic.

== See also ==
- Quasiperiodicity
- Kolmogorov–Arnold–Moser theorem
- The pentagram map, a discrete dynamical system exhibiting a quasiperiodic motion
