= Parovicenko space =

Type of topological space

In mathematics, a Parovicenko space is a topological space similar to the space of non-isolated points of the Stone–Čech compactification of the integers.

== Definition ==
A Parovicenko space is a topological space X satisfying the following conditions:

- X is compact Hausdorff
- X has no isolated points
- X has weight c, the cardinality of the continuum (this is the smallest cardinality of a base for the topology).
- Every two disjoint open F_{σ} subsets of X have disjoint closures
- Every non-empty G_{δ} of X has non-empty interior.

== Properties ==
The space βN\N is a Parovicenko space, where βN is the Stone–Čech compactification of the natural numbers N. Parovicenko (1963) proved that the continuum hypothesis implies that every Parovicenko space is isomorphic to βN\N. van Douwen & van Mill (1978) showed that if the continuum hypothesis is false then there are other examples of Parovicenko spaces.
