= Dyadic space =

Type of topological space

In mathematics, a dyadic compactum is a Hausdorff topological space that is the continuous image of a product of discrete two-point spaces, and a dyadic space is a topological space with a compactification which is a dyadic compactum. However, many authors use the term dyadic space with the same meaning as dyadic compactum above.

Dyadic compacta and spaces satisfy the Suslin condition, and were introduced by Russian mathematician Pavel Alexandrov. Polyadic spaces are generalisation of dyadic spaces.
