= Letter of the Ninety-Nine =

Letter of the Ninety-Nine (Russian: Письмо девяноста девяти) is a collective open letter signed in 1968 by 99 renowned Soviet mathematicians in defense of their colleague Alexander Esenin-Volpin, who was forcibly committed to a psychiatric hospital due to his dissident activities. The letter became a significant event in the history of both Soviet mathematics and the human rights movement.

== Background ==
Alexander Yesenin-Volpin was an active dissident. From 1949 onward, he was repeatedly arrested by state security agencies and forcibly committed to psychiatric institutions. On December 5, 1965, Constitution Day, Alexander Sergeyevich organized a rally on Pushkinskaya Square in Moscow demanding a public trial for the writers Andrei Sinyavsky and Yuli Daniel, who had been arrested for publishing their books abroad. He was constantly under KGB surveillance. The KGB specifically insisted on preventing Yesenin-Volpin from participating in the International Congress of Mathematicians held in Moscow on August 16, 1966, fearing that he might pass on information unfavourable to the authorities to foreign participants in the congress.

== Forced Hospitalization ==
On February 14, 1968, Alexander Yesenin-Volpin was forcibly hospitalized "by order of the Chief Psychiatrist of Moscow," I.K. Yanushevsky. The Chronicle of Current Events noted that the hospitalization was illegal, as this type of medical care could only be ordered by a court. Furthermore, the instruction "On the Emergency Hospitalization of Mentally Ill Persons Posing a Social Danger" was violated, as it required that the relatives of the hospitalized person be notified, and that upon arrival at the hospital, the person should be examined by a three-person commission within 24 hours. Neither was done.

Professor Dmitry Fuchs believes that Yesenin-Volpin's isolation was timed to coincide with the approaching 15th anniversary of Stalin's death (March 5). Professor Yulij Ilyashenko writes that the hospitalization was a response to Yesenin-Volpin’s demand to be admitted to the trial of Daniel and Sinyavsky.

== Public protest ==
Yesenin-Volpin's friends and colleagues collected signatures for an open letter of protest to the authorities by March 9, which became known as the "Letter of Ninety-Nine." In reality, the letter collected approximately 130 signatures, but a version with 99 was sent.

According to Yulij Ilyashenko's memoirs, Aleksandr Kronrod and Evgenii Landis were among the letter's organizers, while its first signatories were Izrail Gelfand and Igor Shafarevich. Maria, wife of dissident Grigory Pod'yapolsky, notes in her memoirs that "the idea of writing such an open letter belonged to Irina Christie, and the literary design was provided by Yuri Aikhenvald. Irina Christie and Akiva Yaglom were the most active signature collectors".

The letter was sent to the Soviet Minister of Health Boris Petrovsky and the Soviet Prosecutor General, Roman Rudenko, with a copy to the Chief Psychiatrist of Moscow. It was also published in the West (specifically, by The New York Times and broadcast by the Voice of America radio station).

The appeal was signed, among others, by Academician Pyotr Novikov (Yesenin-Volpin was his graduate student), Corresponding Members of the Soviet Academy of Sciences Israel Gelfand, Lazar Lyusternik, Andrei Markov, Dmitrii Menshov, Sergei Novikov, Igor Shafarevich, 31 doctors of physical and mathematical sciences, and others (including Vadim Yankov).

After collecting signatures, a postscript was added to the letter: "Please send your response to the following address: Moscow-234, Leninskie Gory, Lomonosov Moscow State University, Faculty of Mechanics and Mathematics, addressed to any of the signatories of this letter." Sergei Novikov believes that this postscript exposed the Mechanics and Mathematics Department of Moscow State University to attack by the authorities, thereby removing academic institutions from its jurisdiction.

Leading Soviet mathematicians, academicians Andrey Kolmogorov and Pavel Alexandrov, did not sign the collective letter, but sent similar letters in their own names.

On March 24, Yesenin-Volpin's mother and wife released a statement protesting the authorities' actions. They also noted that after the publication of the "Letter 99," on March 16, Volpin was transferred to the more secure 32nd Department of the Kashchenko Hospital at the Institute of Psychiatry of the USSR Academy of Medical Sciences.

On May 12, Yesenin-Volpin was discharged from the psychiatric hospital after three months of forced treatment.

In Russia, the letter was first published (with a number of inaccuracies and 96 signatures) in the book "A.S. Yesenin-Volpin. Philosophy. Logic. Poetry". "Human Rights Defense: Selected Works" in 1999.

== Consequences ==
The letter became a major milestone in the relationship between the Soviet authorities and the mathematical community. Many of the letter's signatories were subjected to repression. For example, Academician Pyotr Novikov was dismissed from his position as head of a department at the Moscow State Pedagogical Institute. Alexander Kronrod's laboratory at the Institute of Theoretical and Experimental Physics was disbanded. Doctor of Physical and Mathematical Sciences and Stalin Prize laureate Naum Meiman, Doctor of Physical and Mathematical Sciences Isaak Yaglom, mathematics instructor at the Faculty of Philology at Moscow University Yuri Shikhanovich, and many others lost their jobs.

The letter resulted in a change in leadership in Soviet mathematical science and education, primarily at Moscow State University. Vladimir Arnold called the signing of the letter an event that "turned the mathematical hierarchy in Russia upside down". Ilyashenko calls the subsequent events "the dark 20th anniversary of the Moscow State University Mechanics and Mathematics Department".

Alexander Daniel and Viktor Finn believe that Yesenin-Volpin's forced hospitalization and the fight for his release "became a notable episode in the development of the human rights movement in the USSR".

== Opinions and Assessments ==
Subsequently, the action received mixed reviews from both participants and researchers. Thus, Professor Yulij Ilyashenko wrote that when the letter was brought to Academician Pyotr Kapitsa for signature, he asked, "What do you want? To make a fuss or to free Yesenin-Volpin? If you free him, then I will free him for you. If you make a fuss, then I am not with you"—and he did not sign the letter. Similar words are attributed to Vladimir Uspensky. Sergei Novikov asserts in his memoirs that the letter was a KGB provocation, a fact that only became clear years later. According to Novikov, the perpetrator of this provocation was Yesenin-Volpin's friend Irina Christie, although he does not rule out the possibility that she could have been used "undercover".
