= Convex compactification =

Concept of mathematics in convex analysis

In mathematics, specifically in convex analysis, the convex compactification is a compactification which is simultaneously a convex subset in a locally convex space in functional analysis. The convex compactification can be used for relaxation (as continuous extension) of various problems in variational calculus and optimization theory. The additional linear structure allows e.g. for developing a differential calculus and more advanced considerations e.g. in relaxation in variational calculus or optimization theory. It may capture both fast oscillations and concentration effects in optimal controls or solutions of variational problems. They are known under the names of relaxed or chattering controls (or sometimes bang-bang controls) in optimal control problems.

The linear structure gives rise to various maximum principles as first-order necessary optimality conditions, known in optimal-control theory as Pontryagin's maximum principle. In variational calculus, the relaxed problems can serve for modelling of various microstructures arising in modelling Ferroics, i.e. various materials exhibiting e.g. Ferroelasticity (as Shape-memory alloys) or Ferromagnetism. The first-order optimality conditions for the relaxed problems leads Weierstrass-type maximum principle.

In partial differential equations, relaxation leads to the concept of measure-valued solutions.

The notion was introduced by Roubíček in 1991.

== Example ==
- The set of Young measures arising from bounded sets in Lebesgue spaces.
- The set of DiPerna-Majda measures arising from bounded sets in Lebesgue spaces.

== See also ==
- Young measures
