= Alexander Esenin-Volpin =

Russian-American poet and mathematician

- Александр Есенин-Вольпин
- Born: May 12, 1924; Leningrad, Russian SFSR, Soviet Union
- Died: March 16, 2016 (aged 91); Boston, Massachusetts, U.S.
- Citizenship: Soviet Union; United States
- Education: Moscow State University
- Occupations: Mathematician; human rights activist; Soviet dissident; poet
- Scientific career
- Fields: Mathematics
- Workplaces: Boston University

Alexander Sergeyevich Esenin-Volpin (Russian: Александр Сергеевич Есенин-Вольпин, IPA: [ɐlʲɪˈksandr sʲɪrˈɡʲejɪvʲɪtɕ jɪˈsʲenʲɪn ˈvolʲpʲɪn]; May 12, 1924 – March 16, 2016) was a Russian-American poet and mathematician known for his foundational role in ultrafinitism. Esenin-Volpin was a prominent Soviet dissident and a leader of the Soviet human rights movement during the 1960s.

Esenin-Volpin was the son of the famous Russian poet Sergei Yesenin and graduated as a Candidate from Moscow State University in 1949. Esenin-Volpin was imprisoned in psikhushkas as a political prisoner several times between 1949 and 1969, spending a total of six years incarcerated for anti-Soviet agitation for publishing samizdat. Esenin-Volpin was exiled to the United States in 1972 and worked as a professor and librarian.

Esenin-Volpin's name is also written Ésénine-Volpine and Yessenin-Volpin in his French and English publications.

== Early life ==
Alexander Sergeyevich Esenin-Volpin was born on 12 May 1924 in Leningrad, Soviet Union. His father was Sergei Yesenin, a celebrated Russian lyric poet who had a complicated relationship with the Bolsheviks. His mother, Nadezhda Volpin, was a Russian-Jewish poet and translator from French and English. Yesenin and Volpin were unmarried literary friends, and Alexander was conceived during an affair in the summer of 1923. Volpina ended their relationship when Yesenin tried to convince her to have an abortion. Alexander never met his father, who died a year after he was born at the Hotel Angleterre in December 1925. Alexander and his mother moved from Leningrad to Moscow in 1933. He graduated from the prestigious Moscow State University with a Candidate dissertation in mathematics in the spring of 1949. After graduation, Volpin was sent to the city of Chernovtsy in the Ukrainian SSR to teach mathematics at the local state university.

== Dissident activity ==
Esenin-Volpin's legal issues for dissident activity began on 21 July 1949, less than a month after his arrival in Chernovtsy, when he was arrested by the MGB, sent on a plane back to Moscow, and incarcerated in the Lubyanka Building. He was charged with "systematically conducting anti-Soviet agitation, writing anti-Soviet poems, and reading them to acquaintances." Apprehensive about the prospect of prison and labor camps, he faked a suicide attempt in order to initiate a psychiatric evaluation. This resulted in psychiatrists at Moscow's Serbsky Institute declaring him mentally incompetent, and in October 1949 he was transferred to the Leningrad Psychiatric Prison Hospital for an indefinite stay. Imprisonment in a psikhushka (psychiatric hospital) was a common form of punishment for dissidents in the Soviet Union. However, a year later, Esenin-Volpin was abruptly released from the prison hospital, and sentenced to five years exile in Karaganda in the Kazakh SSR as a "socially dangerous element." He found employment as a teacher of evening and correspondence courses in mathematics. He was released from exile in Karaganda in December 1953 as part of an amnesty following the death of Joseph Stalin, and returned to Moscow. Soon he became a known mathematician. In particular, he adhered to the philosophical theories of ultrafinitism and intuitionism and worked on development of these.

In the summer of 1959, Esenin-Volpin was invited to mathematical symposium in the Polish People's Republic (a Soviet satellite state) to be held the following month. He applied for a passport to travel to Poland, but his application was immediately denied and he received a reply stating that mentally ill Soviet citizens were not permitted to travel abroad. Instead, Volpin forwarded the text of his paper to Warsaw, which was read out in his name at the symposium, with the explanation that he had been prevented from attending in person. That year, Esenin-Volpin was arrested for smuggling samizdat (illegal literature) to the West and again placed in a psikhushka. The works were a collection of poems and his Свободный философский трактат (Free Philosophical Tractate), which he had signed with his own name. He was diagnosed with the pseudo-scientific disorder "sluggish schizophrenia", though Yuri Savenko would diagnose him with only cyclothymia. He spent two years in the psychiatric hospital, and continued to smuggle samizdat to the West after his release.

=== 1965 Glasnost demonstration ===
In 1965, Esenin-Volpin organized a legendary "glasnost meeting" ("митинг гласности"), a demonstration at Pushkinskaya Square in the center of Moscow demanding an open and fair trial for the arrested writers Andrei Sinyavsky and Yuli Daniel. The leaflets written by Esenin-Volpin and distributed through samizdat asserted that the accusations and their closed-door trial were in violation of the 1936 Soviet Constitution and the more recent RSFSR Criminal Procedural Code. The meeting was attended by about 200 people, many of whom turned out to be KGB operatives. The slogans read: "Требуем гласности суда над Синявским и Даниэлем" (We demand an open trial for Sinyavski and Daniel) and "Уважайте советскую конституцию" (Respect the Soviet constitution). The demonstrators were promptly arrested.

[Volpin] would explain to anyone who cared to listen a simple but unfamiliar idea: all laws ought to be understood in exactly the way they are written and not as they are interpreted by the government and the government ought to fulfill those laws to the letter [...]. What would happen if citizens acted on the assumption that they have rights? If one person did it, he would become a martyr; if two people did it, they would be labeled an enemy organization; if thousands of people did it, the state would have to become less oppressive.

— Fellow dissident and human rights activist Lyudmila Alexeyeva on the approach spearheaded by Esenin-Volpin

In the following years, Esenin-Volpin became an important voice in the human rights movement in the Soviet Union. He was one of the first Soviet dissidents who took on a "legalist" strategy of dissent. He proclaimed that it is possible and necessary to defend human rights by strictly observing the law, and in turn demand that the authorities observe the formally guaranteed rights. Esenin-Volpin was again hospitalized in February 1968 as one of those protesting most strongly against the trial of Alexander Ginzburg and Yury Galanskov (Galanskov-Ginzburg trial).

In 1968, Esenin-Volpin was again imprisoned in a psychiatric hospital, prompting the Letter of the Ninety-Nine to be sent to the Soviet authorities asking for his release. This fact became public and the Voice of America conducted a broadcast on the topic; he was released almost immediately thereafter. Vladimir Bukovsky was quoted as saying that Esenin-Volpin's diagnosis was "pathological honesty". That year, he circulated his famous "Памятка для тех, кому предстоят допросы" (Memo for those who expect to be interrogated) widely used by fellow dissidents in the Soviet Union.

In 1969, Esenin-Volpin signed the first Appeal to The UN Committee for Human Rights, drafted by the Initiative Group for the Defense of Human Rights in the USSR. In 1970, he joined the Committee on Human Rights in the USSR and worked with Yuri Orlov, Andrei Sakharov and other Soviet human rights activists.

== Emigration ==
In May 1972, Esenin-Volpin emigrated to the United States at the insistence of the Soviet government, but his Soviet citizenship was not revoked as was customary at the time for exiled people. He worked at the University of Buffalo and Boston University, first as a professor then as a librarian. In 1973, he was one of the signers of the Humanist Manifesto.

In 1977, Esenin-Volpin again alarmed the Soviet authorities by threatening to sue them for spreading rumours that he was mentally ill.

In 2005, Esenin-Volpin participated in "They Chose Freedom", a four-part television documentary on the history of the Soviet dissident movement.

Esenin-Volpin died on March 16, 2016 in Boston at the age of 91.

== Mathematics ==
His early work was in general topology, where he introduced Esenin-Volpin's theorem. Most of his later work was on the foundations of mathematics, where he introduced ultrafinitism, an extreme form of constructive mathematics that casts doubt on the existence of not only infinite sets, but even of large integers such as 10^{12}. He sketched a program for proving the consistency of Zermelo–Fraenkel set theory using ultrafinitistic techniques in (Ésénine-Volpine 1961), (Yessenin-Volpin 1970) and (Yessenin-Volpin 1981).

I have seen some ultrafinitists go so far as to challenge the existence of 2^{100} as a natural number, in the sense of there being a series of "points" of that length. There is the obvious "draw the line" objection, asking where in 2^{1}, 2^{2}, 2^{3}, … , 2^{100} do we stop having "Platonistic reality"? Here this … is totally innocent, in that it can be easily be replaced by 100 items (names) separated by commas. I raised just this objection with the (extreme) ultrafinitist Yessenin-Volpin during a lecture of his. He asked me to be more specific. I then proceeded to start with 2^{1} and asked him whether this is "real" or something to that effect. He virtually immediately said yes. Then I asked about 2^{2}, and he again said yes, but with a perceptible delay. Then 2^{3}, and yes, but with more delay. This continued for a couple of more times, till it was obvious how he was handling this objection. Sure, he was prepared to always answer yes, but he was going to take 2^{100} times as long to answer yes to 2^{100} then he would to answering 2^{1}. There is no way that I could get very far with this.

— Harvey M. Friedman, "Philosophical Problems in Logic"

=== Mathematical publications ===
- Ésénine-Volpine, A. S. (1961), "Le programme ultra-intuitionniste des fondements des mathématiques", Infinitistic Methods (Proc. Sympos. Foundations of Math., Warsaw, 1959), Oxford: Pergamon, pp. 201–223, MR 0147389 Reviewed by Kreisel, G.; Ehrenfeucht, A. (1967), "Le Programme Ultra-Intuitionniste des Fondements des Mathematiques by A. S. Ésénine-Volpine", The Journal of Symbolic Logic, 32 (4), Association for Symbolic Logic: 517, doi:10.2307/2270182, JSTOR 2270182, S2CID 117082459
- Yessenin-Volpin, A. S. (1970), "The ultra-intuitionistic criticism and the antitraditional program for foundations of mathematics", in Kino, A.; Myhill, J.; Vesley, R. E. (eds.), Intuitionism and proof theory (Proc. Conf., Buffalo, N.Y., 1968), Studies in Logic and the Foundations of Mathematics, Amsterdam: North-Holland, pp. 3–45, MR 0295876 Reviewed by Geiser, James R. (1975), "The Ultra-Intuitionistic Criticism and the Antitraditional Program for Foundations of Mathematics. by A. S. Yessenin-Volpin", The Journal of Symbolic Logic, 40 (1), Association for Symbolic Logic: 95–97, doi:10.2307/2272294, JSTOR 2272294
- Yessenin-Volpin, A. S. (1981), "About infinity, finiteness and finitization (in connection with the foundations of mathematics)", in Richman, Fred (ed.), Constructive mathematics (Las Cruces, N.M., 1980), Lecture Notes in Math., vol. 873, Berlin-New York: Springer, pp. 274–313, doi:10.1007/BFb0090740, ISBN 3-540-10850-5, MR 0644507

== Audio-visual material ==
- "Alexander Esenin-Volpin interview June 29, 1982". June 29, 1982.
