= Wallman compactification =

A compactification of T_{1} topological spaces

In mathematics, the Wallman compactification, generally called Wallman–Shanin compactification is a compactification of T_{1} topological spaces that was constructed by Wallman (1938).

== Definition ==
The points of the Wallman compactification ωX of a space X are the maximal proper filters in the poset of closed subsets of X. Explicitly, a point of ωX is a family $\mathcal F$ of closed nonempty subsets of X such that $\mathcal F$ is closed under finite intersections, and is maximal among those families that have these properties. For every closed subset F of X, the class Φ_{F} of points of ωX containing F is closed in ωX. The topology of ωX is generated by these closed classes.

== Special cases ==
For normal spaces, the Wallman compactification is homeomorphic to the Stone–Čech compactification. The homeomorphism is a result of zero-sets and closed sets behaving similarly under the continuous, bounded functions guaranteed by Urysohn's Lemma.

== See also ==
- Lattice (order)
- Pointless topology
