= Quasiperiodic function =

Class of functions behaving "like" periodic functions

In mathematics, a quasiperiodic function is a function that has a certain similarity to a periodic function. A function $f$ is quasiperiodic with quasiperiod $\omega$ if $f(z + \omega) = g(z,f(z))$, where $g$ is a "simpler" function than $f$. What it means to be "simpler" is vague.

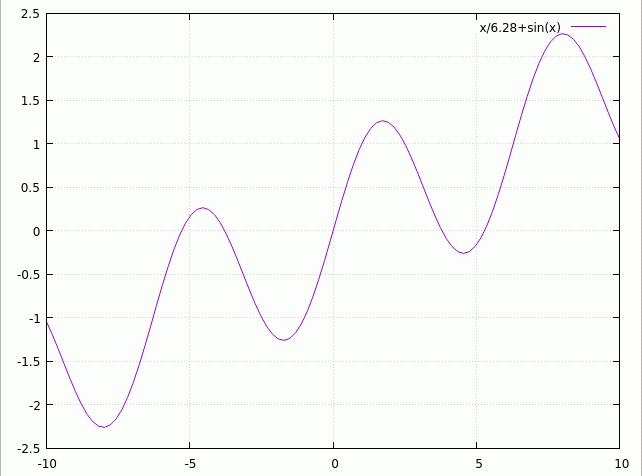
The function f(x) = x/2π + sin(x) satisfies the equation f(x + 2π) = f(x) + 1, and is hence arithmetic quasiperiodic.

A simple case (sometimes called arithmetic quasiperiodic) is if the function obeys the equation
$$f(z + \omega) = f(z) + C.$$

Another case (sometimes called geometric quasiperiodic) is if the function obeys the equation
$$f(z + \omega) = C f(z).$$
An example of this is the Jacobi theta function, where
$$\vartheta(z + \tau; \tau) = e^{-2\pi iz - \pi i\tau} \vartheta(z; \tau),$$
shows that for fixed $\tau$ it has quasiperiod $\tau$; it also is periodic with period one.

Another example is provided by the Weierstrass sigma function, which is quasiperiodic in two independent quasiperiods, the periods of the corresponding Weierstrass ℘ function. Bloch's theorem says that the eigenfunctions of a periodic Schrödinger equation (or other periodic linear equations) can be found in quasiperiodic form, and a related form of quasi-periodic solution for periodic linear differential equations is expressed by Floquet theory.

Functions with an additive functional equation
$$f(z + \omega) = f(z) + az + b$$
are also called quasiperiodic. An example of this is the Weierstrass zeta function, where $\zeta(z + \omega, \Lambda) = \zeta(z , \Lambda) + \eta (\omega, \Lambda)$ for a z-independent η when ω is a period of the corresponding Weierstrass ℘ function.

In the special case where $f(z + \omega) = f(z)$, we say that f is periodic with period ω in the period lattice $\Lambda$.

== Quasiperiodic signals ==
Quasiperiodic signals in the sense of audio processing are not quasiperiodic functions in the sense defined here; instead they have the nature of almost periodic functions, and that article should be consulted. The more vague and general notion of quasiperiodicity has even less to do with quasiperiodic functions in the mathematical sense.

A useful example is the function
$$f(z) = \sin(Az) + \sin(Bz).$$
If the ratio A/B is rational, this will have a true period, but if A/B is irrational, there is no true period, but a succession of increasingly accurate "almost" periods.

== See also ==
- Quasiperiodic motion
