= Stone–Čech compactification =

Concept in topology

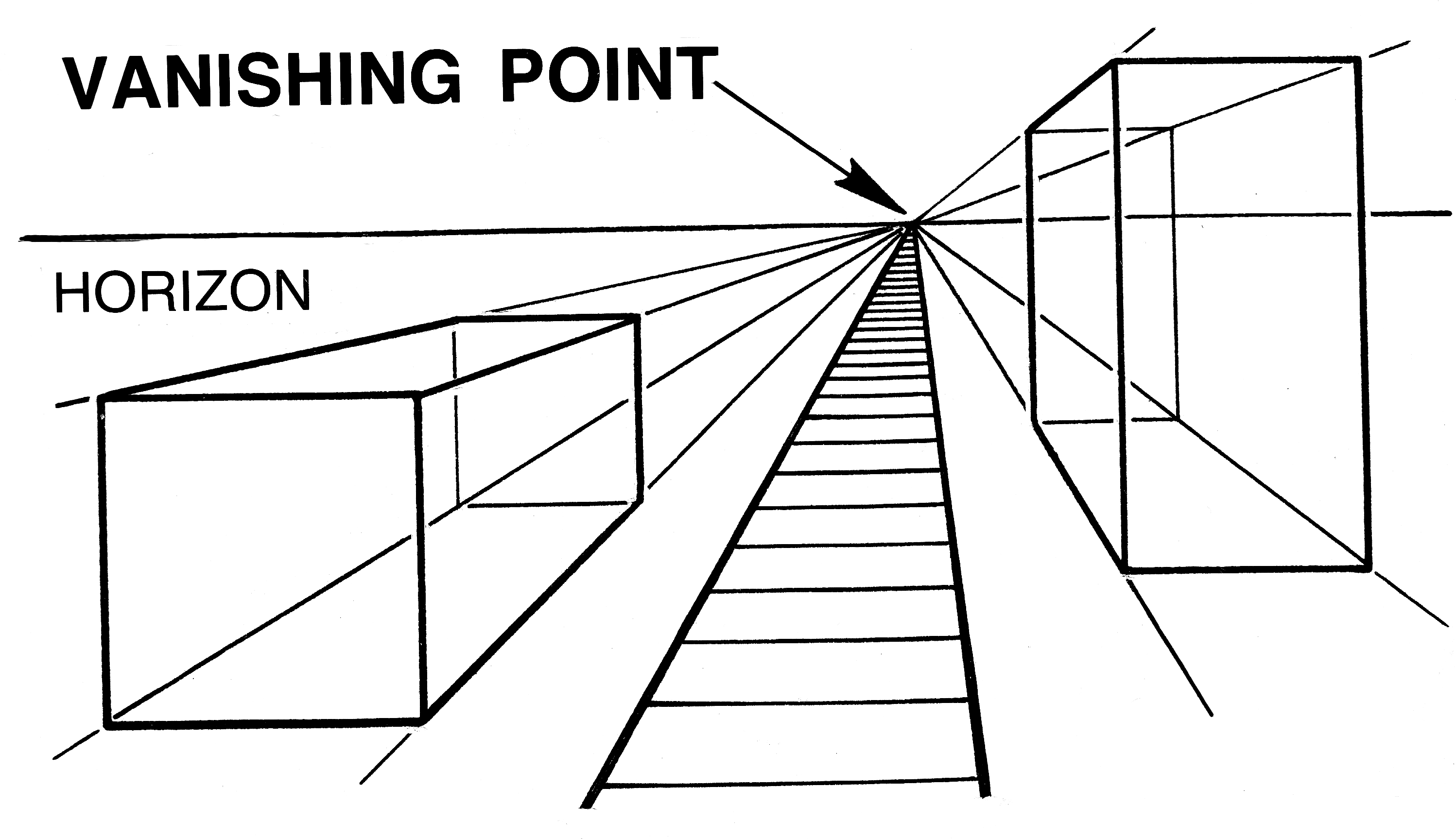
A vanishing point illustrates how adding limit points at infinity can complete a visual space.

An important problem in topology is how to enlarge a space by adding points so that certain kinds of limits exist. The Stone–Čech compactification of a space provides the most extensive such enlargement: it adds enough points to ensure the existence of all generalized limits, including those detected by nets or ultrafilters rather than ordinary sequences. The construction was implicitly introduced by Andrey Nikolayevich Tikhonov (1930) and explicitly described by Marshall Stone (1937) and Eduard Čech (1937).

In more detail, the Stone–Čech compactification is a technique for constructing a universal map from a topological space X to a compact Hausdorff space $\beta X$. The Stone–Čech compactification $\beta X$ is the unique "most general" compact Hausdorff space generated by X, in the sense that any continuous map from X into any other compact Hausdorff space factors uniquely through $\beta X$. If the space X is a Tychonoff space, the map from X to $\beta X$ is an embedding, and X can be identified as a dense subspace of $\beta X$. For a Tychonoff space, $\beta X$ is the largest compactification of X: any other Hausdorff compactification of X is a quotient space of $\beta X$. For infinite spaces, the structure of $\beta X$ is often extremely complex, and proving its existence generally requires the axiom of choice.

== Motivation ==
The goal of compactification is to "enlarge" a space by adding idealized limit points to fill in any "holes" or missing boundaries. Because compact spaces are mathematically well-behaved, it is often useful to embed a non-compact space into a compact one. There are often multiple ways to add these points, depending on how the original space is embedded into a larger framework.

=== Extension of continuous functions ===
A primary motivation for the Stone–Čech compactification is to ensure that arbitrary bounded continuous functions on the original space can be extended to the compactification. For example, the open interval $(0,1)$ is usually compactified into the closed interval $[0,1]$ by adding two endpoints. However, continuous functions on $(0,1)$ might not extend to $[0,1]$. If the interval is embedded into the plane by mapping $x$ to $(x, \sin(1/x))$ (the "topologist's sine curve"), the closure adds an entire vertical line segment of limit points rather than a single point. In that embedding, the value of $\sin(1/x)$ can be recovered simply using the projection onto the second coordinate, which naturally extends to the closure. This observation leads to the product space construction of the Stone–Čech compactification. If adding one function as a coordinate allows that specific function to extend continuously, then embedding the space into a high-dimensional product space—with one coordinate for every possible bounded continuous function—allows all such functions to extend. The Stone–Čech compactification, denoted $\beta X$, is the closure of the space X within this maximal product space. Because it is constructed to accommodate every possible continuous extension, $\beta X$ is characterized by a universal property: every bounded continuous function on X extends uniquely to a continuous function on $\beta X$.

=== Comparison with one-point compactification ===
Another motivation is to avoid the restrictiveness of smaller compactifications. For an uncountably infinite discrete space D, the one-point compactification $D^* = D \cup {\infty}$ results in a space where a function $f: D^* \to \mathbb{R}$ is continuous if and only if it is constant everywhere except on a countable subset of D. In the original discrete space, every function was continuous; the one-point compactification "destroys" the continuity of the vast majority of functions. By contrast, the Stone–Čech compactification $\beta D$ is the compactification where all bounded functions $f: D \to \mathbb{R}$ extend to continuous functions on $\beta D$. It is much larger than the one-point compactification; while $D^*$ adds only a single point, $\beta D$ adds uncountably many.

== History ==
Andrey Nikolayevich Tikhonov introduced completely regular spaces in 1930 in order to avoid the pathological situation of Hausdorff spaces whose only continuous real-valued functions are constant maps.

In the same 1930 article where Tychonoff defined completely regular spaces, he also proved that every Tychonoff space (i.e. Hausdorff completely regular space) has a Hausdorff compactification (in this same article, he also proved Tychonoff's theorem). In 1937, Čech extended Tychonoff's technique and introduced the notation βX for this compactification. Stone also constructed βX in a 1937 article, although using a very different method. Despite Tychonoff's article being the first work on the subject of the Stone–Čech compactification and despite Tychonoff's article being referenced by both Stone and Čech, Tychonoff's name is rarely associated with βX.

== Universal property and functoriality ==
The Stone–Čech compactification of the topological space X is a compact Hausdorff space βX together with a continuous map i_{X} : X → βX that has the following universal property: any continuous map f : X → K, where K is a compact Hausdorff space, extends uniquely to a continuous map βf : βX → K, i.e. (βf)i_{X} = f.

The universal property of the Stone-Cech compactification expressed in diagram form.

As is usual for universal properties, this universal property characterizes βX up to homeomorphism.

As is outlined in § Constructions, below, one can prove (using the axiom of choice) that such a Stone–Čech compactification i_{X} : X → βX exists for every topological space X. Furthermore, the image i_{X}(X) is dense in βX.

Some authors add the assumption that the starting space X be Tychonoff (or even locally compact Hausdorff), for the following reasons:

- The map from X to its image in βX is a homeomorphism if and only if X is Tychonoff.
- The map from X to its image in βX is a homeomorphism to an open subspace if and only if X is locally compact Hausdorff.

The Stone–Čech construction can be performed for more general spaces X, but in that case the map X → βX need not be a homeomorphism to the image of X (and sometimes is not even injective).

As is usual for universal constructions like this, the extension property makes β a functor from Top (the category of topological spaces) to CHaus (the category of compact Hausdorff spaces). Further, if we let U be the inclusion functor from CHaus into Top, maps from βX to K (for K in CHaus) correspond bijectively to maps from X to UK (by considering their restriction to X and using the universal property of βX). i.e.

Hom(βX, K) ≅ Hom(X, UK),

which means that β is left adjoint to U. This implies that CHaus is a reflective subcategory of Top with reflector β.

== Examples ==
If X is a compact Hausdorff space, then it coincides with its Stone–Čech compactification.

The Stone–Čech compactification of the first uncountable ordinal $\omega_1$, with the order topology, is the ordinal $\omega_1 + 1$. The Stone–Čech compactification of the deleted Tychonoff plank is the Tychonoff plank. These examples do not require the axiom of choice.

== Constructions ==
=== Construction using products ===
One attempt to construct the Stone–Čech compactification of X is to take the closure of the image of X in
$$\prod\nolimits_{f:X\to K} K$$

where the product is over all maps from X to compact Hausdorff spaces K (or, equivalently, the image of X by the right Kan extension of the identity functor of the category CHaus of compact Hausdorff spaces along the inclusion functor of CHaus into the category Top of general topological spaces). (Note: Refer to Example 4.6.12 for an explicit left adjoint construction, or to Proposition 6.5.2 for how left adjoints can be seen as right Kan extensions in Riehl (2014). Category Theory in Context. p. 149, 210.) By Tychonoff's theorem this product of compact spaces is compact, and the closure of X in this space is therefore also compact. This works intuitively but fails for the technical reason that the collection of all such maps is a proper class rather than a set. There are several ways to modify this idea to make it work; for example, one can restrict the compact Hausdorff spaces K to have underlying set P(P(X)) (the power set of the power set of X), which is sufficiently large that it has cardinality at least equal to that of every compact Hausdorff space to which X can be mapped with dense image.

=== Construction using the unit interval ===
One way of constructing βX is to let C be the set of all continuous functions from X into [0, 1] and consider the map $e: X \to [0,1]^{C}$ where
$$e(x): f \mapsto f(x)$$

This may be seen to be a continuous map onto its image, if [0, 1]^{C} is given the product topology. By Tychonoff's theorem we have that [0, 1]^{C} is compact since [0, 1] is. Consequently, the closure of X in [0, 1]^{C} is a compactification of X.

In fact, this closure is the Stone–Čech compactification. To verify this, we just need to verify that the closure satisfies the appropriate universal property. We do this first for K = [0, 1], where the desired extension of f : X → [0, 1] is just the projection onto the f coordinate in [0, 1]^{C}. In order to then get this for general compact Hausdorff K we use the above to note that K can be embedded in some cube, extend each of the coordinate functions and then take the product of these extensions.

The special property of the unit interval needed for this construction to work is that it is a cogenerator of the category of compact Hausdorff spaces: this means that if A and B are compact Hausdorff spaces, and f and g are distinct maps from A to B, then there is a map h : B → [0, 1] such that hf and hg are distinct. Any other cogenerator (or cogenerating set) can be used in this construction.

=== Construction using ultrafilters ===
Alternatively, if X is discrete, then it is possible to construct $\beta X$ as the set of all ultrafilters on X, with the elements of X corresponding to the principal ultrafilters. The topology on the set of ultrafilters, known as the Stone topology, is generated by sets of the form $\{ F : U \in F \}$ for U a subset of X.

Again we verify the universal property: For $f : X \to K$ with K compact Hausdorff and F an ultrafilter on X we have an ultrafilter base $f(F)$ on K, the pushforward of F. This has a unique limit because K is compact Hausdorff, say x, and we define $\beta f(F) = x.$ This may be verified to be a continuous extension of f.

Equivalently, one can take the Stone space of the complete Boolean algebra of all subsets of X as the Stone–Čech compactification. This is really the same construction, as the Stone space of this Boolean algebra is the set of ultrafilters (or equivalently prime ideals, or homomorphisms to the 2-element Boolean algebra) of the Boolean algebra, which is the same as the set of ultrafilters on X.

The construction can be generalized to arbitrary Tychonoff spaces by using maximal filters of zero sets instead of ultrafilters. (Filters of closed sets suffice if the space is normal.)

=== Construction using C*-algebras ===
The Stone–Čech compactification is naturally homeomorphic to the spectrum of C_{b}(X). Here C_{b}(X) denotes the C*-algebra of all continuous bounded complex-valued functions on X with sup-norm. Notice that C_{b}(X) is canonically isomorphic to the multiplier algebra of C_{0}(X).

== The Stone–Čech compactification of the natural numbers ==
In the case where X is locally compact, e.g. N or R, the image of X forms an open subset of βX, or indeed of any compactification, (this is also a necessary condition, as an open subset of a compact Hausdorff space is locally compact). In this case one often studies the remainder of the space, βX ∖ X. This is a closed subset of βX, and so is compact. We consider N with its discrete topology and write βN ∖ N = N* (but this does not appear to be standard notation for general X).

As explained above, one can view βN as the set of ultrafilters on N, with the topology generated by sets of the form $\{ F : U \in F \}$ for U a subset of N. The set N corresponds to the set of principal ultrafilters, and the set N* to the set of free ultrafilters.

The study of βN, and in particular N*, is a major area of modern set-theoretic topology. The major results motivating this are Parovicenko's theorems, essentially characterising its behaviour under the assumption of the continuum hypothesis.

These state:

- Every compact Hausdorff space of weight at most $\aleph_1$ (see Aleph number) is the continuous image of N* (this does not need the continuum hypothesis, but is less interesting in its absence).
- If the continuum hypothesis holds then N* is the unique Parovicenko space, up to isomorphism.

These were originally proved by considering Boolean algebras and applying Stone duality.

Jan van Mill has described βN as a "three headed monster"—the three heads being a smiling and friendly head (the behaviour under the assumption of the continuum hypothesis), the ugly head of independence which constantly tries to confuse you (determining what behaviour is possible in different models of set theory), and the third head is the smallest of all (what you can prove about it in ZFC). It has relatively recently been observed that this characterisation isn't quite right—there is in fact a fourth head of βN, in which forcing axioms and Ramsey type axioms give properties of βN almost diametrically opposed to those under the continuum hypothesis, giving very few maps from N* indeed. Examples of these axioms include the combination of Martin's axiom and the Open colouring axiom which, for example, prove that (N*)^{2} ≠ N*, while the continuum hypothesis implies the opposite.

=== An application: the dual space of the space of bounded sequences of reals ===
The Stone–Čech compactification βN can be used to characterize $\ell^\infty(\mathbf{N})$ (the Banach space of all bounded sequences in the scalar field R or C, with supremum norm) and its dual space.

Given a bounded sequence $a\in \ell^\infty(\mathbf{N})$ there exists a closed ball B in the scalar field that contains the image of a. a is then a function from N to B. Since N is discrete and B is compact and Hausdorff, a is continuous. According to the universal property, there exists a unique extension βa : βN → B. This extension does not depend on the ball B we consider.

We have defined an extension map from the space of bounded scalar valued sequences to the space of continuous functions over βN.

$$\ell^\infty(\mathbf{N}) \to C(\beta \mathbf{N})$$

This map is bijective since every function in C(βN) must be bounded and can then be restricted to a bounded scalar sequence.

If we further consider both spaces with the sup norm the extension map becomes an isometry. Indeed, if in the construction above we take the smallest possible ball B, we see that the sup norm of the extended sequence does not grow (although the image of the extended function can be bigger).

Thus, $\ell^\infty(\mathbf{N})$ can be identified with C(βN). This allows us to use the Riesz representation theorem and find that the dual space of $\ell^\infty(\mathbf{N})$ can be identified with the space of finite Borel measures on βN.

Finally, it should be noticed that this technique generalizes to the L^{∞} space of an arbitrary measure space X. However, instead of simply considering the space βX of ultrafilters on X, the right way to generalize this construction is to consider the Stone space Y of the measure algebra of X: the spaces C(Y) and L^{∞}(X) are isomorphic as C*-algebras as long as X satisfies a reasonable finiteness condition (that any set of positive measure contains a subset of finite positive measure).

=== A monoid operation on the Stone–Čech compactification of the naturals ===
The natural numbers form a monoid under addition. It turns out that this operation can be extended (generally in more than one way, but uniquely under a further condition) to βN, turning this space also into a monoid, though rather surprisingly a non-commutative one.

For any subset, A, of N and a positive integer n in N, we define
$$A-n=\{k\in\mathbf{N}\mid k+n\in A\}.$$

Given two ultrafilters F and G on N, we define their sum by

$$F+G = \Big\{A\subseteq\mathbf{N}\mid \{n\in\mathbf{N}\mid A-n\in F\}\in G\Big\};$$

it can be checked that this is again an ultrafilter, and that the operation + is associative (but not commutative) on βN and extends the addition on N; 0 serves as a neutral element for the operation + on βN. The operation is also right-continuous, in the sense that for every ultrafilter F, the map
$$\begin{cases} \beta \mathbf{N} \to \beta \mathbf{N} \\ G \mapsto F+G \end{cases}$$
is continuous.

More generally, if S is a semigroup with the discrete topology, the operation of S can be extended to βS, getting a right-continuous associative operation.

== Applications ==
The Stone–Čech compactification has significant applications in Ramsey theory and topological algebra. While $\beta S$ is constructed as a topological object, if the underlying space S is a discrete semigroup (such as the natural numbers $\mathbb{N}$ under addition), the algebraic operation on S can be extended to $\beta S$. This turns $\beta S$ into a compact right topological semigroup. The algebraic structure of $\beta S$—specifically the properties of its idempotent elements and its ideal structure—can be used to prove deep combinatorial results about the original set S.

A prominent example of this utility is the Central Sets Theorem. In the study of the Stone–Čech compactification, a subset A of a semigroup S is defined as central if it is a member of an idempotent ultrafilter in the minimal ideal $K(\beta S)$. The Central Sets Theorem (attributed to Furstenberg and later generalized by Hindman and Strauss) guarantees that these central sets are combinatorially rich.

For a commutative semigroup S, the Central Sets Theorem states that if A is a central subset of S, then for any specification of sequences in S, there exist sequences $(a_n)$ in S and $(H_n)$ of finite subsets of $\mathbb{N}$ satisfying specific sum-set conditions contained entirely within A. The importance of the Stone–Čech compactification in this context is that it provides the machinery to prove the existence of these regular patterns. The proof relies on the fact that $\beta S$ is a compact space, allowing for the use of Zorn's lemma to find minimal ideals and idempotents, which in turn correspond to the existence of the desired combinatorial structures in the integers. This topological approach provides proofs for results such as Van der Waerden's theorem and the Hales–Jewett theorem.

The applications of the Stone–Čech compactification extend beyond partition regularity into density Ramsey theory and ergodic theory. While classical Ramsey theory asks which cell of a partition contains a structure, density Ramsey theory asserts that any "large" subset of the natural numbers (specifically, sets with positive upper Banach density) must contain structured patterns, such as arbitrarily long arithmetic progressions (Szemerédi's theorem).

The Stone–Čech compactification provides a bridge between these number-theoretic problems and dynamical systems via Furstenberg's correspondence principle. This principle allows problems involving sets of positive density in the integers to be translated into problems involving measure-preserving systems. In this framework, ultrafilters in $\beta \mathbb{N}$ are used to rigorously define limits of oscillating sequences, enabling the construction of specific probability measures on the associated dynamical spaces. Additionally, the algebraic structure of $\beta \mathbb{N}$ (specifically the properties of the set $\Delta^*$ of ultrafilters whose members all have positive Banach density) allows for the proof of "strong density" versions of combinatorial theorems that are difficult to establish through elementary methods.

The Stone–Čech compactification of a discrete set shows that every compact Hausdorff space has a cover by an extremally disconnected profinite set. This is used in Condensed mathematics to show that condensed sets may be described as functors from extremally disconnected profinite sets to sets sending finite coproducts to products.

== See also ==
- Compactification (mathematics) – Embedding a topological space into a compact space as a dense subset
- Filters in topology – Application of set theory concept
- One-point compactification – Way to extend a non-compact topological space
- Wallman compactification – A compactification of T_{1} topological spaces
