= Harald Bohr =

Danish mathematician and footballer (1887–1951)

- Harald Bohr
- Born: Harald August Bohr; 22 April 1887; Copenhagen, Denmark
- Died: 22 January 1951 (aged 63); Gentofte, Denmark
- Resting place: Assistens Cemetery, Copenhagen
- Education: University of Copenhagen
- Occupation: Mathematician
- Parent(s): Christian and Ellen Bohr
- Relatives: Niels Bohr (brother)
Association football career
- Position: Defender
Youth career
- –1904: Akademisk Boldklub
Senior career*
Years	Team	Apps	(Gls)
1904–1910	Akademisk Boldklub		
International career
1908–1910	Denmark	4	(2)
Medal record
Olympic medal record
Representing Denmark
Men's football
Silver medal – second place	1908 London	Team competition
- * Club domestic league appearances and goals

Harald August Bohr (22 April 1887 – 22 January 1951) was a Danish mathematician and footballer. After receiving his doctorate in 1910, Bohr became an eminent mathematician, founding the field of almost periodic functions. His brother was the Nobel Prize-winning physicist Niels Bohr. He was on the Denmark national team for the 1908 Summer Olympics, where he won a silver medal.

== Biography ==
Bohr was born in 1887 to Christian Bohr, a professor of physiology, from a Lutheran background, and Ellen Adler Bohr, a woman from a wealthy Jewish family of local renown. Harald had a close relationship with his elder brother, which The Times likened to that between Captain Cuttle and Captain Bunsby in Charles Dickens' Dombey and Son.

== Mathematical career ==
Like his father and brother before him, in 1904 Bohr enrolled at the University of Copenhagen, where he studied mathematics, obtaining his master's degree in 1909 and his doctorate a year later. Among his tutors were Hieronymus Georg Zeuthen and Thorvald N. Thiele. Bohr worked in mathematical analysis; much of his early work was devoted to Dirichlet series including his doctorate, which was entitled Bidrag til de Dirichletske Rækkers Theori (Contributions to the Theory of Dirichlet Series). A collaboration with Göttingen-based Edmund Landau resulted in the Bohr–Landau theorem, regarding the distribution of zeroes in zeta functions.

Bohr worked in mathematical analysis, founding the field of almost periodic functions, and worked with the Cambridge mathematician G. H. Hardy.

In 1915, he became a professor at Polyteknisk Læreanstalt (today Technical University of Denmark), working there until 1930, when he took a professorship at the University of Copenhagen. He remained in this post for 21 years until his death in 1951. Børge Jessen was one of his students there.

He was a visiting professor at Stanford University during the academic year 1930–1931. He was a visiting scholar at the Institute for Advanced Study in the summer of 1948.

Bohr was known as a good teacher, and the annual award for outstanding teaching at the University of Copenhagen is called the Harald, in honour of Harald Bohr. With Johannes Mollerup, Bohr wrote an influential four-volume textbook Lærebog i Matematisk Analyse (Textbook in mathematical analysis).

Bohr was elected to the American Philosophical Society in 1945.

In the 1930s Bohr was a leading critic of the anti-Semitic policies taking root in the German mathematical establishment, publishing an article criticising Ludwig Bieberbach's ideas in Berlingske Aften in 1934. Following the murder of Kaj Munk on 4 January 1944 the Danish resistance newspaper De frie Danske brought condemning reactions from influential Scandinavians, including Bohr.

== Football ==
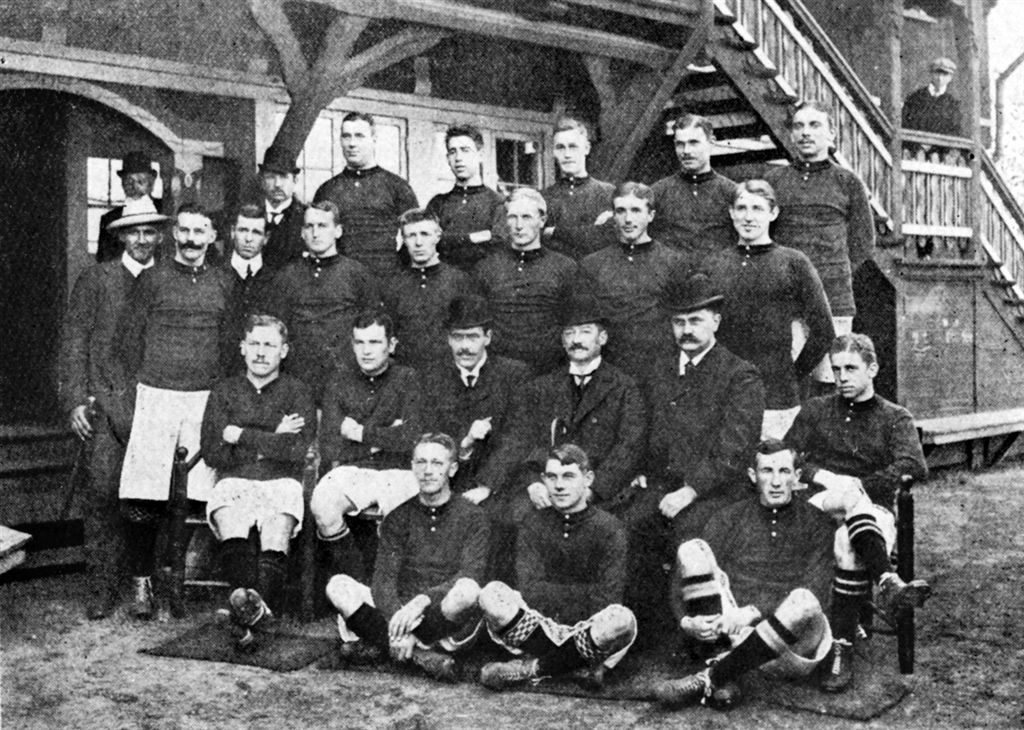
Danish football team at the 1908 Olympic games. Bohr is in the top row, 2nd from left.

Bohr was also an excellent football player. He had a long playing career with Akademisk Boldklub, making his debut as a 16-year-old in 1903. During the 1905 season he played alongside his brother Niels, who was a goalkeeper. Harald was selected to play for the Denmark national team in the 1908 Summer Olympics, where football was an official event for the first time. Though a Danish side had played at the 1906 Intercalated Games, the opening match of the 1908 Olympic tournament was Denmark's first official international football match. Bohr scored two goals as Denmark beat the French "B" team 9–0. In the next match, the semi-final, Bohr played in a 17–1 win against France, which remains an Olympic record. Denmark faced hosts Great Britain in the final, but lost 2–0, and Bohr won a silver medal. After the Olympics he made one further appearance for the national team, in a 2–1 victory against an England amateur team in 1910. His popularity as a footballer was such that when he defended his doctoral thesis the audience was reported as having more football fans than mathematicians.

== See also ==
- Bohr–Mollerup theorem
- Bohr compactification
- Bohr–Favard inequality
- Danish Mathematical Society
- List of select Jewish football (association; soccer) players
