= Gosper =

Gosper may refer to:

- Gosper County, Nebraska
- Gosper curve
- Bill Gosper (born 1943), American mathematician
- Kevan Gosper (1933–2024), Australian athlete and 1956 Olympic medalist
- John J. Gosper (1843–1913), Nebraska Secretary of State (1873–1875) and Secretary of Arizona Territory (1875–1882).
