= Gosper curve =

Space-filling curve

A fourth-stage Gosper curve

The line from the red to the green point shows a single step of the Gosper curve construction

The Gosper curve, named after Bill Gosper, also known as the Peano-Gosper Curve and the flowsnake (a spoonerism of snowflake), is a space-filling curve whose limit set is rep-7. It is a fractal curve similar in its construction to the dragon curve and the Hilbert curve.

The Gosper curve can also be used for efficient hierarchical hexagonal clustering and indexing.

== Lindenmayer system ==
The Gosper curve can be represented using an L-system with rules as follows:

- Angle: 60°
- Axiom: $A$
- Replacement rules:
  - $A \mapsto A-B--B+A++AA+B-$
  - $B \mapsto +A-BB--B-A++A+B$

In this case both A and B mean to move forward, + means to turn left 60 degrees and - means to turn right 60 degrees - using a "turtle"-style program such as Logo.

== Properties ==
The space filled by the curve is called the Gosper island. The first few iterations of it are shown below:

The Gosper Island can tile the plane. In fact, seven copies of the Gosper island can be joined to form a shape that is similar, but scaled up by a factor of √7 in all dimensions. As can be seen from the diagram below, performing this operation with an intermediate iteration of the island leads to a scaled-up version of the next iteration. Repeating this process indefinitely produces a tessellation of the plane. The curve itself can likewise be extended to an infinite curve filling the whole plane.

== See also ==
- List of fractals by Hausdorff dimension
- M.C. Escher
