= Fibonacci word fractal =

Fractal curve

The Fibonacci word fractal is a fractal curve defined on the plane from the Fibonacci word.

== Definition ==
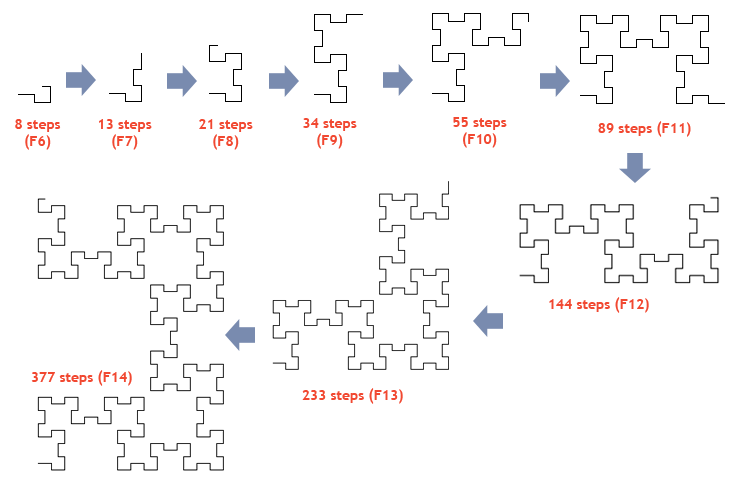
The first iterations

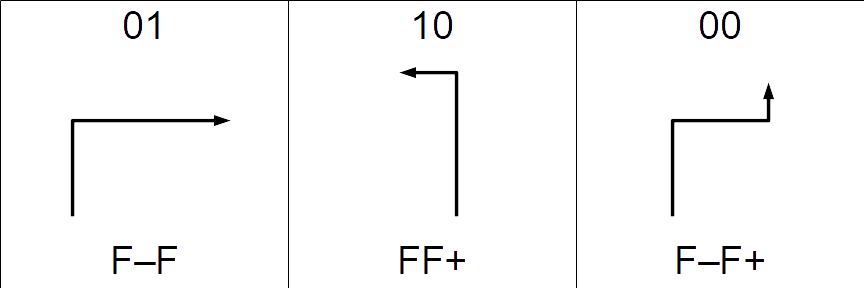
L-system representation

This curve is built iteratively by applying the Odd–Even Drawing rule to the Fibonacci word 0100101001001...:

For each digit at position k:

1. If the digit is 0:
  - Draw a line segment then turn 90° to the left if k is even
  - Draw a line segment then turn 90° to the right if k is odd
2. If the digit is 1:
  - Draw a line segment and stay straight

To a Fibonacci word of length $F_n$ (the n^{th} Fibonacci number) is associated a curve $\mathcal{F}_n$ made of $F_n$ segments. The curve displays three different aspects whether n is in the form 3k, 3k + 1, or 3k + 2.

== Properties ==
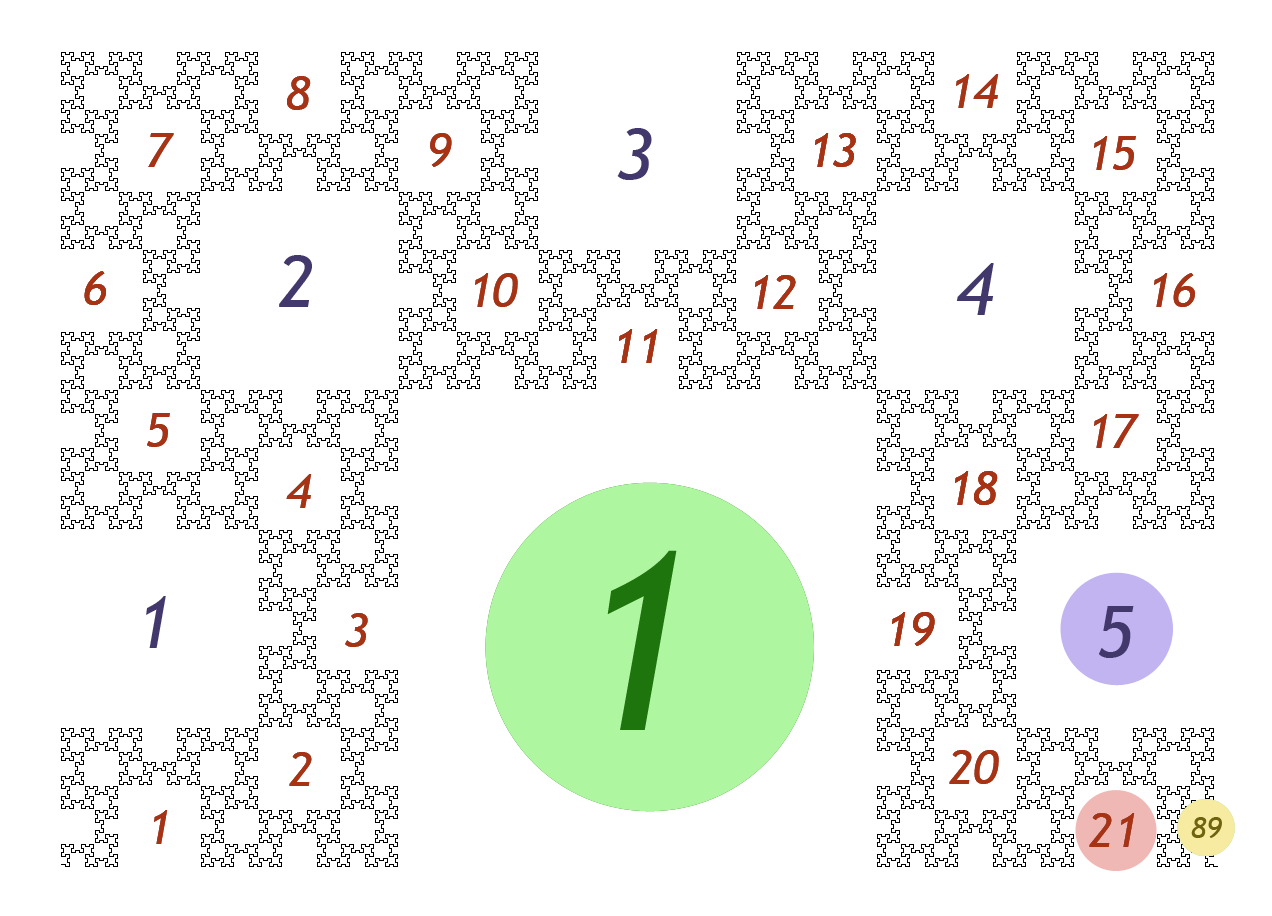
The Fibonacci numbers in the Fibonacci word fractal.

Some of the Fibonacci word fractal's properties include:

- The curve $\mathcal{F_n}$ contains $F_n$ segments, $F_{n-1}$ right angles and $F_{n-2}$ flat angles.
- The curve never self-intersects and does not contain double points. At the limit, it contains an infinity of points asymptotically close.
- The curve presents self-similarities at all scales. The reduction ratio is $1+\sqrt{2}$. This number, also called the silver ratio, is present in a great number of properties listed below.
- The number of self-similarities at level n is a Fibonacci number \ −1. (more precisely: $F_{3n+3}-1$).
- The curve encloses an infinity of square structures of decreasing sizes in a ratio $1+\sqrt{2}$ (see figure). The number of those square structures is a Fibonacci number.
- The curve $\mathcal{F}_n$can also be constructed in different ways (see gallery below):
  - Iterated function system of 4 and 1 homothety of ratio $1/(1+\sqrt2)$ and $1/(1+\sqrt2)^2$
  - By joining the curves $\mathcal{F}_{n-1}$ and $\mathcal{F}_{n-2}$
  - Lindenmayer system
  - By an iterated construction of 8 square patterns around each square pattern.
  - By an iterated construction of octagons
- The Hausdorff dimension of the Fibonacci word fractal is $3\,\frac{\log\varphi}{\log(1+\sqrt 2)}\approx 1.6379$, with $\varphi = \frac{1+\sqrt{5}}{2}$ the golden ratio.
- Generalizing to an angle $\alpha$ between 0 and $\pi/2$, its Hausdorff dimension is $3\,\frac{\log\varphi}{\log(1+a+\sqrt{(1+a)^2+1})}$, with $a=\cos\alpha$.
- The Hausdorff dimension of its frontier is $\frac{\log 3}{{\log(1+\sqrt 2})}\approx 1.2465$.
- Exchanging the roles of "0" and "1" in the Fibonacci word, or in the drawing rule yields a similar curve, but oriented 45°.
- From the Fibonacci word, one can define the «dense Fibonacci word», on an alphabet of 3 letters: 102210221102110211022102211021102110221022102211021... (sequence A143667 in the OEIS). The usage, on this word, of a more simple drawing rule, defines an infinite set of variants of the curve, among which:
  - a "diagonal variant"
  - a "svastika variant"
  - a "compact variant"
- It is conjectured that the Fibonacci word fractal appears for every sturmian word for which the slope, written in continued fraction expansion, ends with an infinite sequence of "1"s.

== Gallery ==
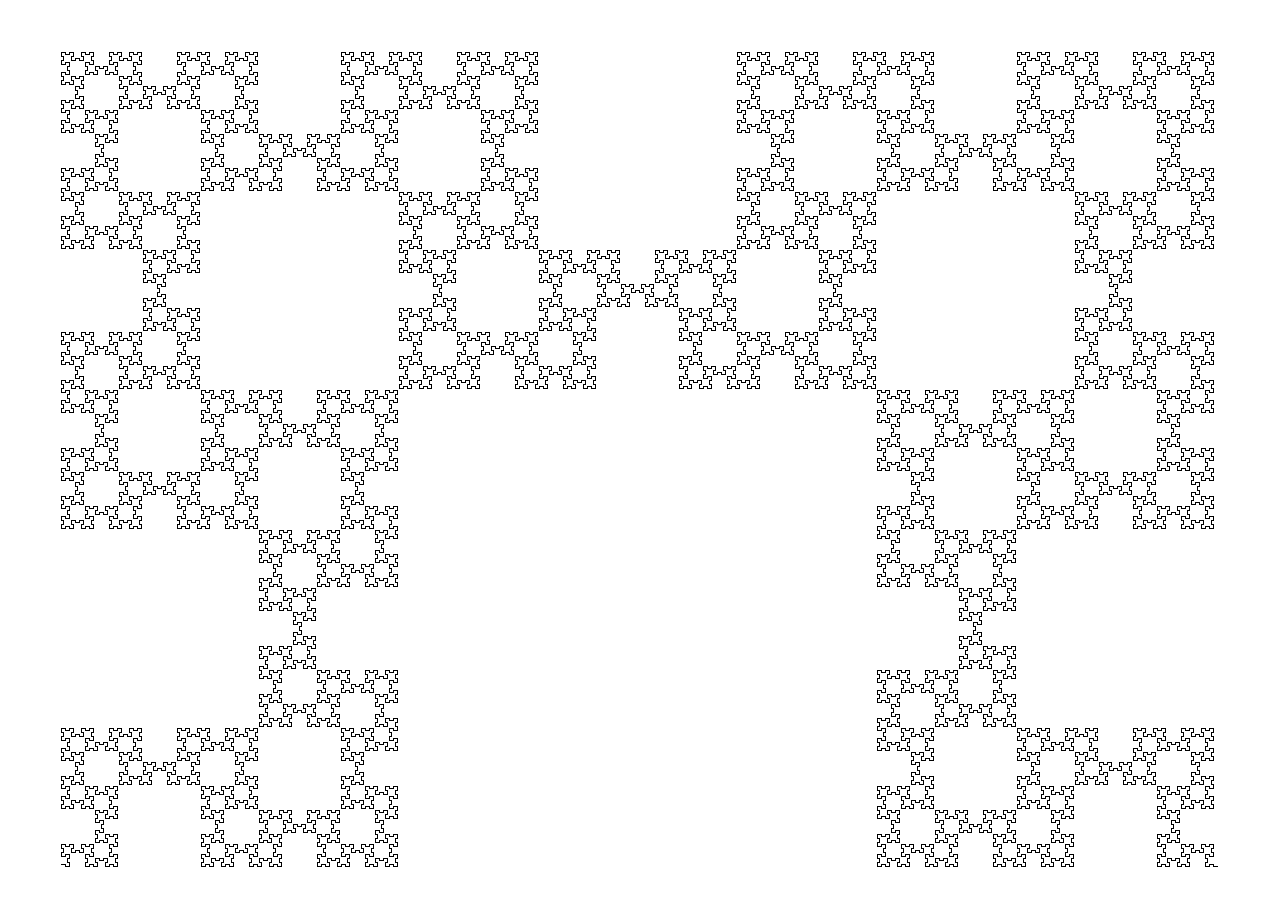
Curve after $\textstyle{F_{23}}$ iterations.

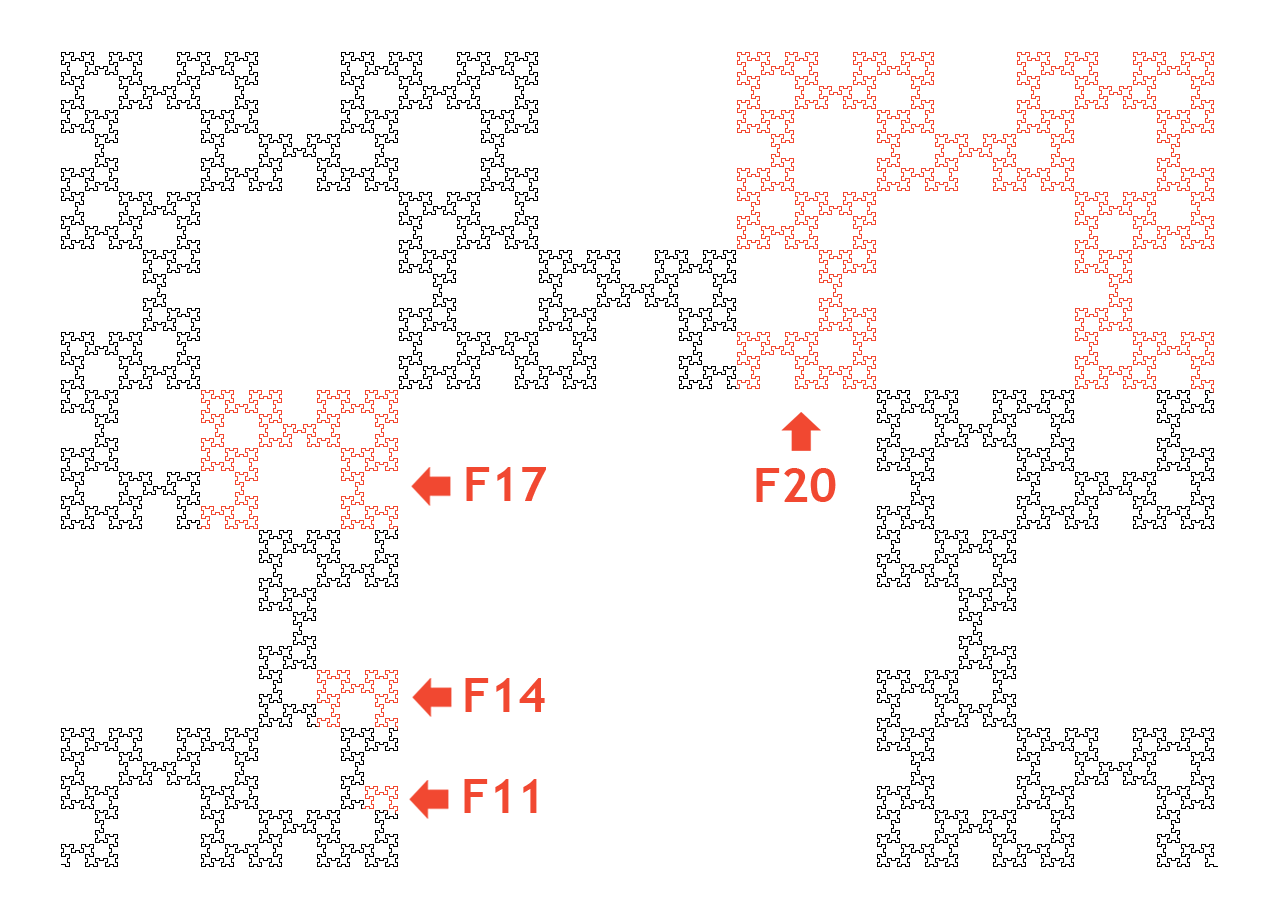
Self-similarities at different scales.

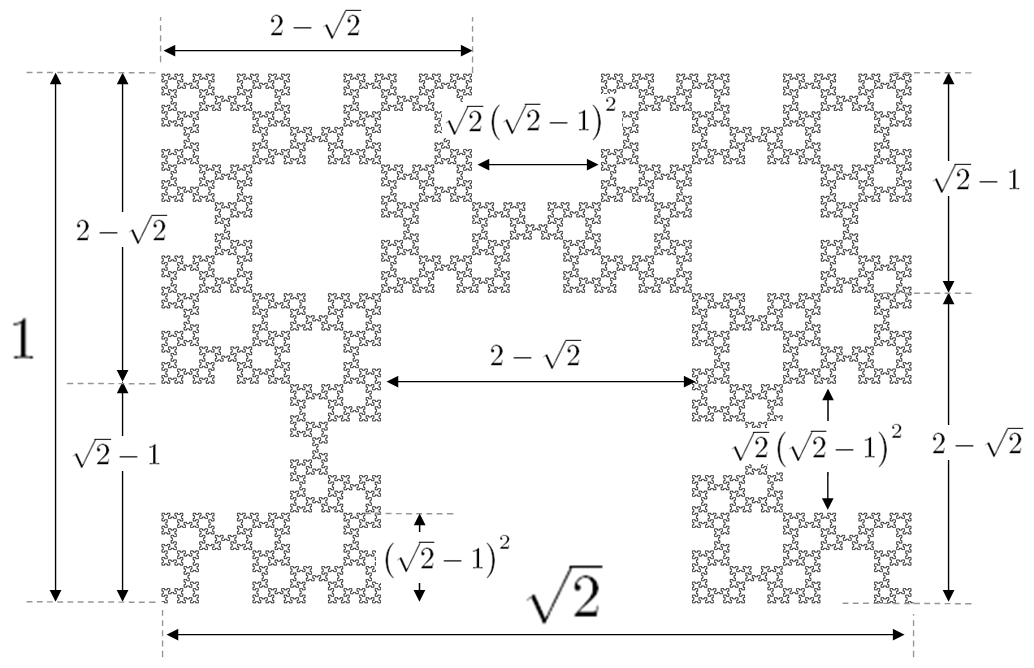
Dimensions.

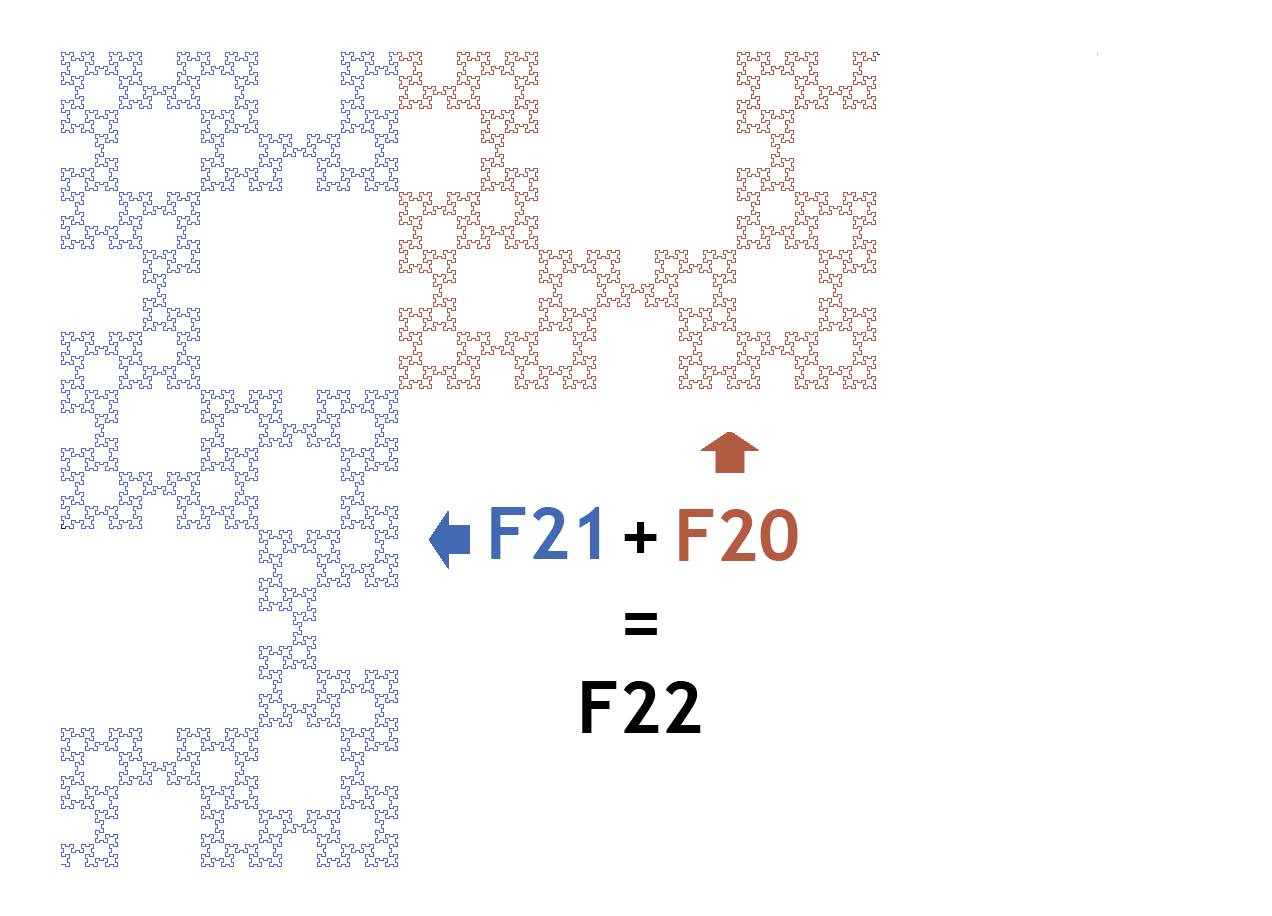
Construction by juxtaposition (1)

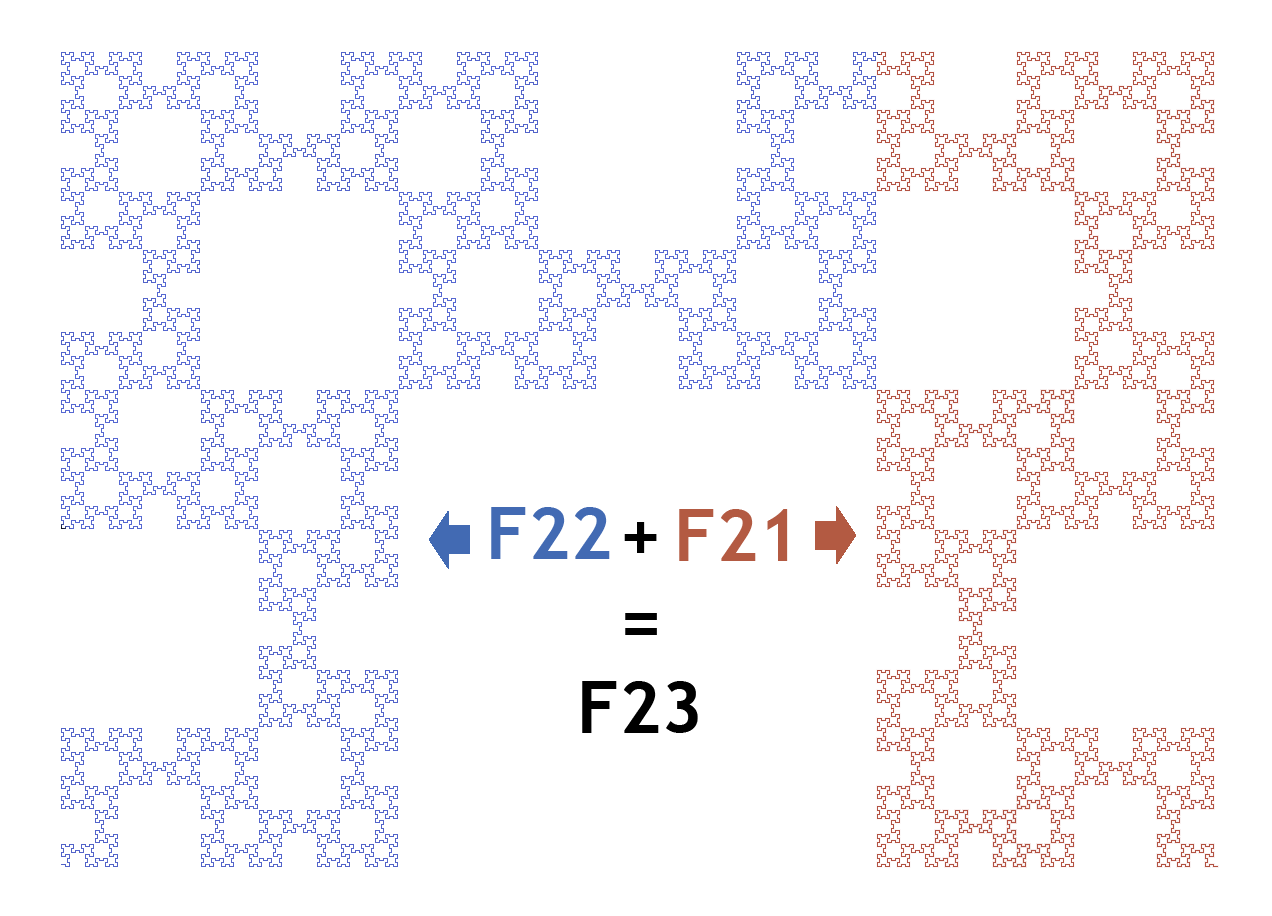
Construction by juxtaposition (2)

Order 18, with some sub-rectangles colored.

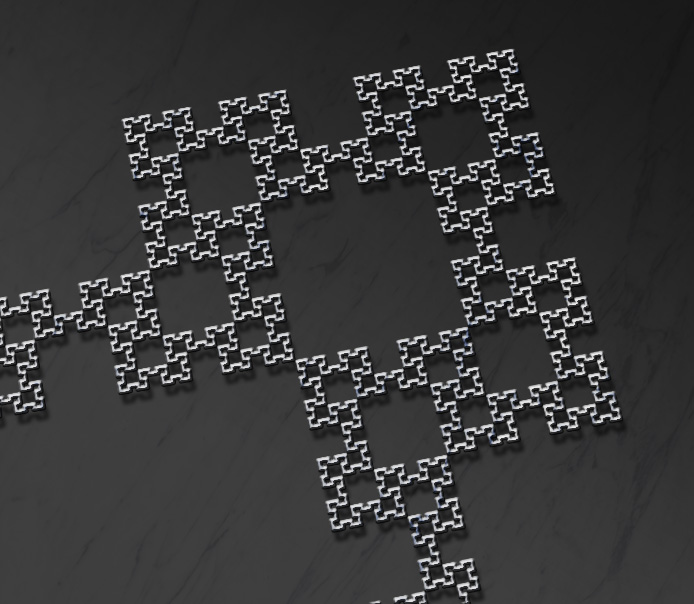

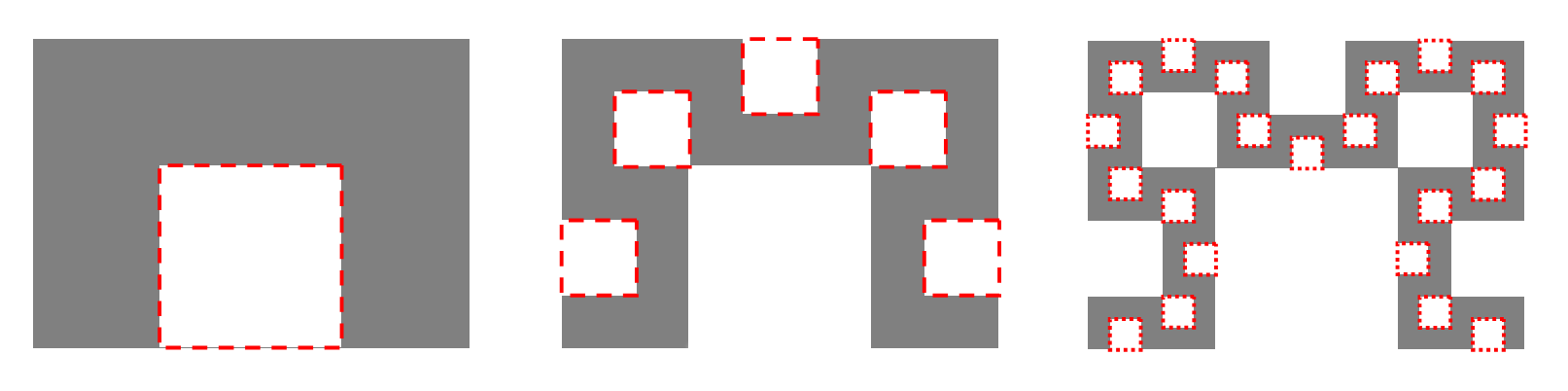
Construction by iterated suppression of square patterns.

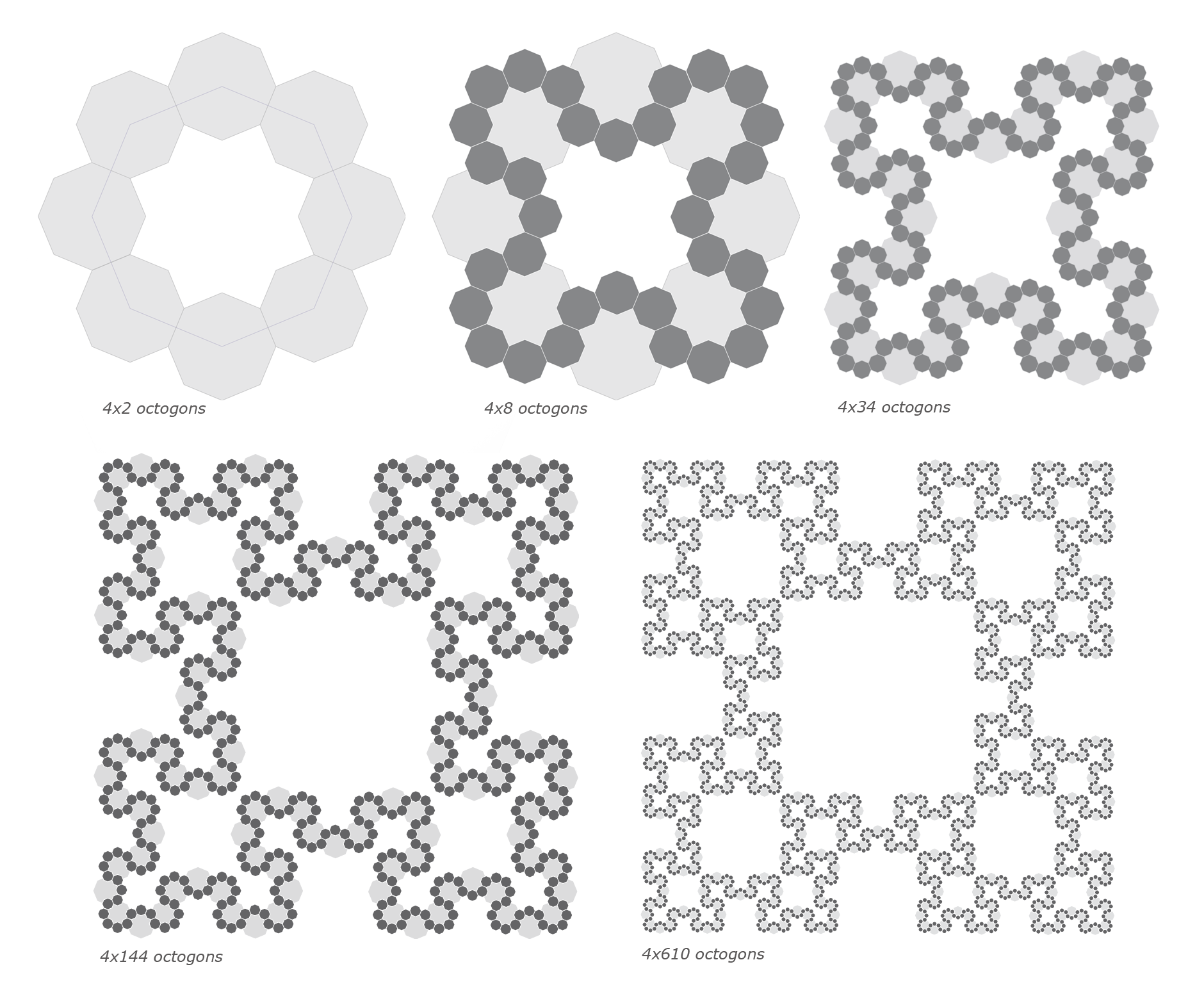
Construction by iterated octagons.

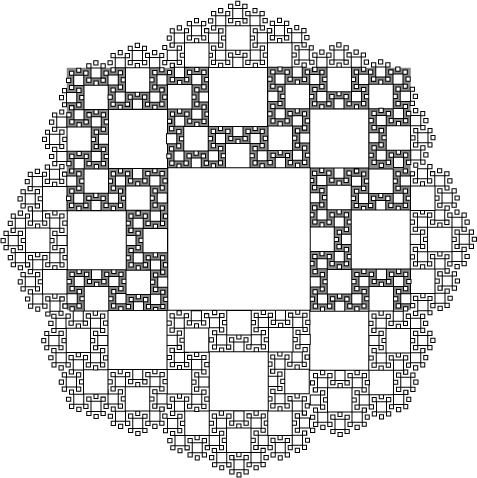
Construction by iterated collection of 8 square patterns around each square pattern.

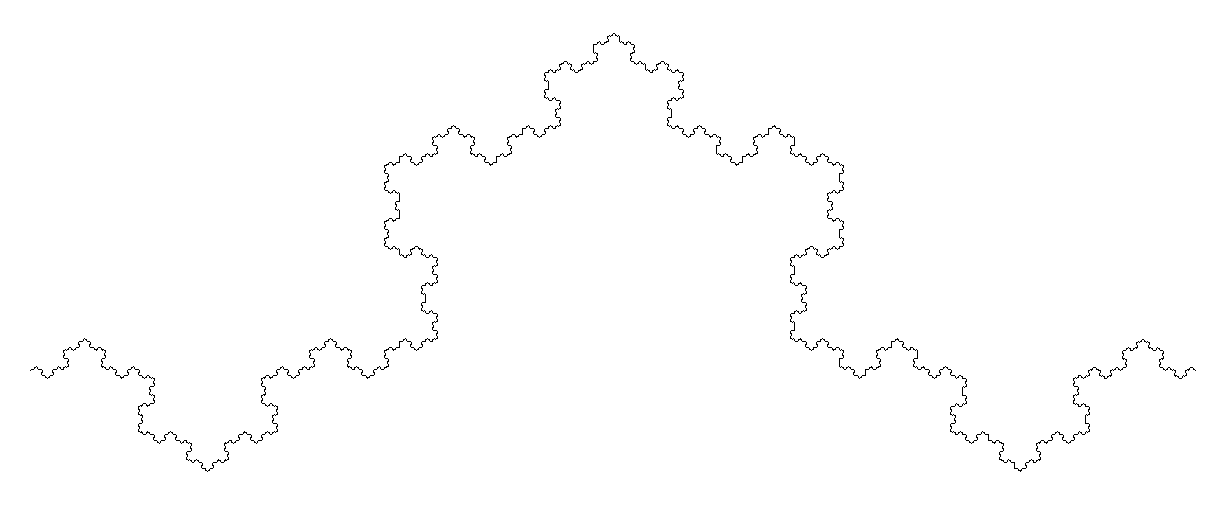
With a 60° angle.

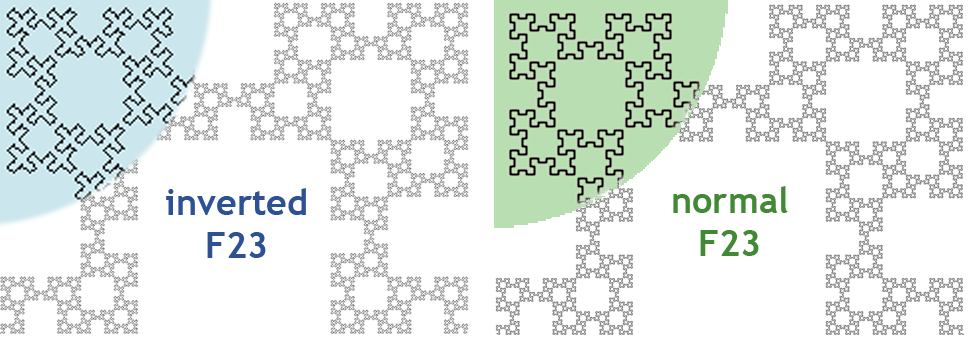
Inversion of "0" and "1".

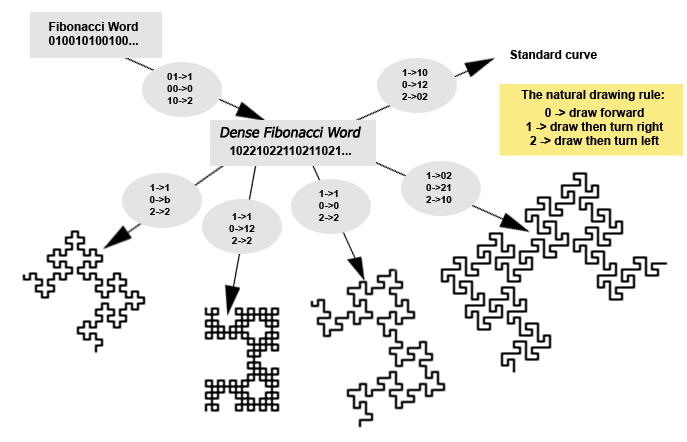
Variants generated from the dense Fibonacci word.

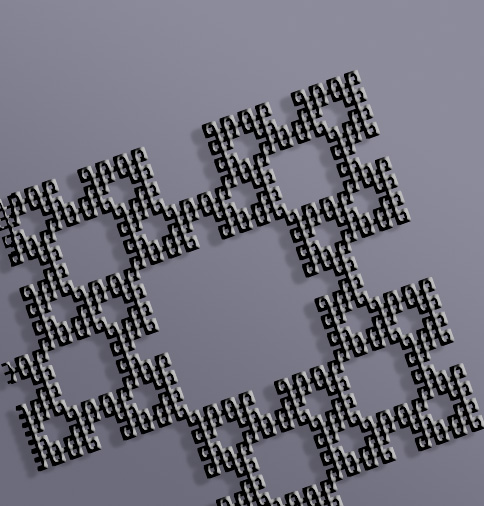
The "compact variant"

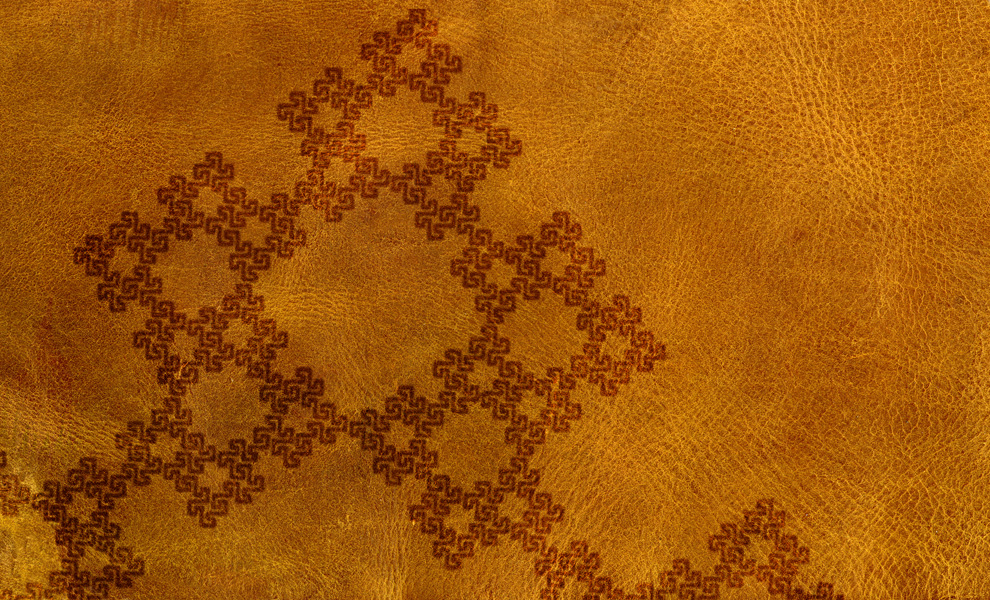
The "svastika variant"

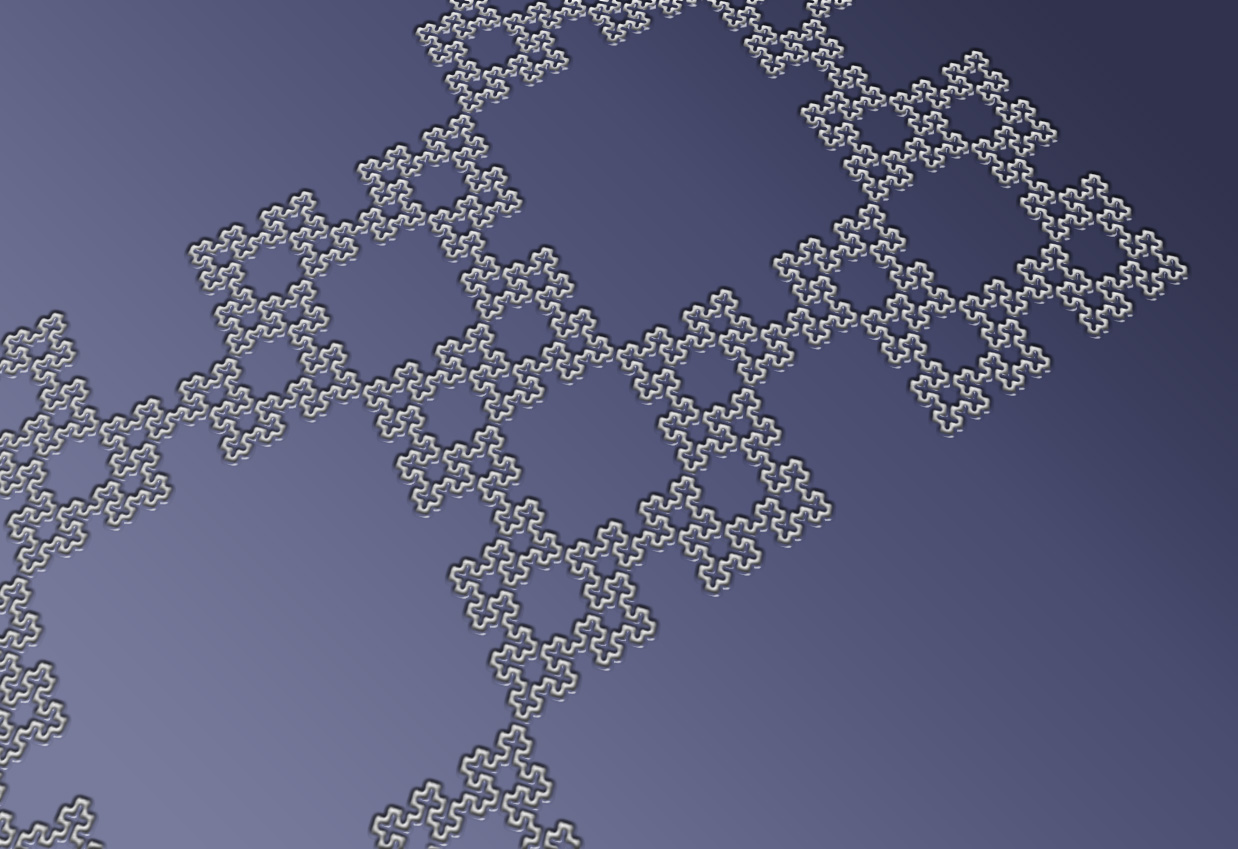
The "diagonal variant"

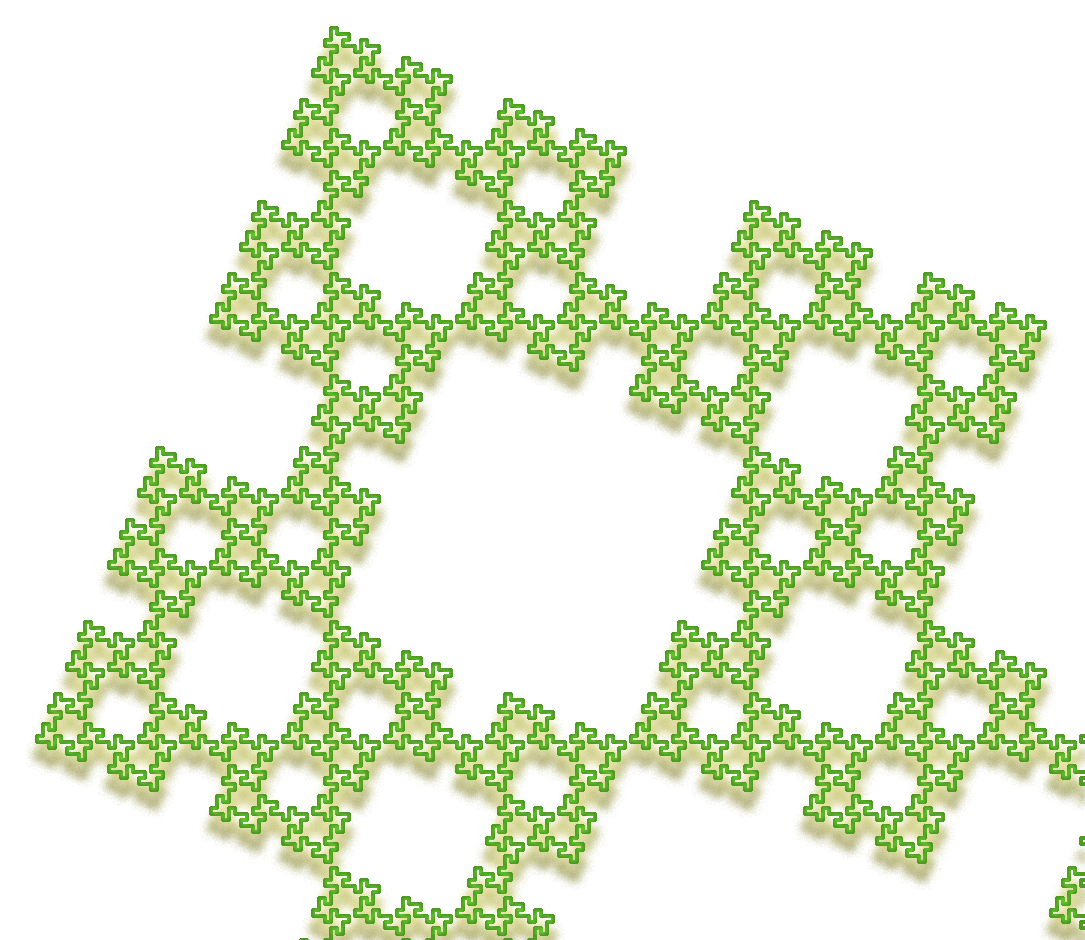
The "π/8 variant"

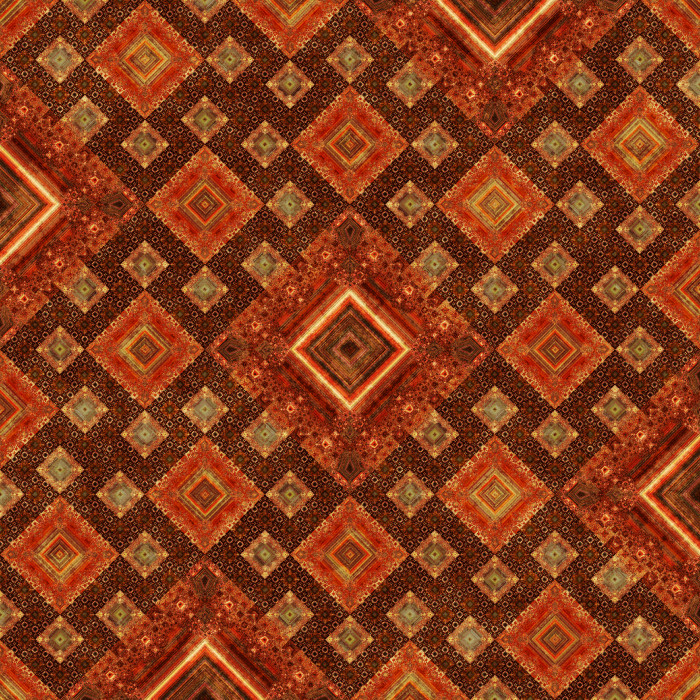
Artist creation (Samuel Monnier).

== The Fibonacci tile ==
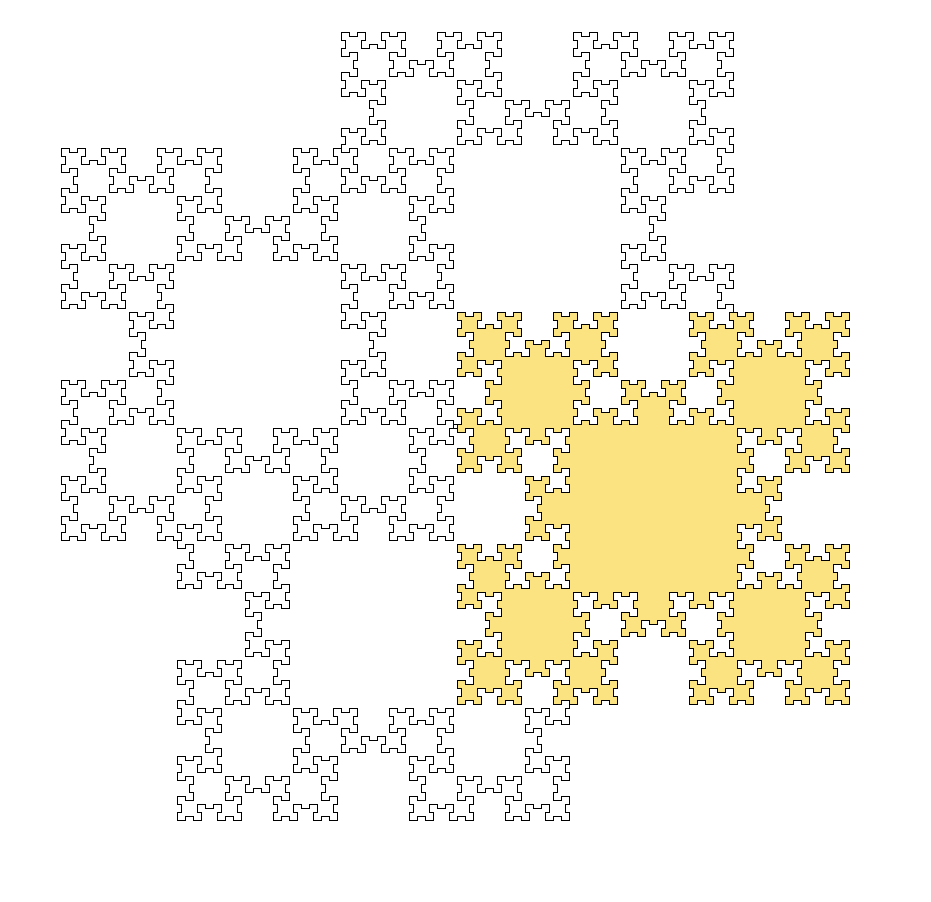
Imperfect tiling by the Fibonacci tile. The area of the central square tends to zero.

The juxtaposition of four $F_{3k}$ curves allows the construction of a closed curve enclosing a surface whose area is not null. This curve is called a "Fibonacci tile".

- The Fibonacci tile almost tiles the plane. The juxtaposition of 4 tiles (see illustration) leaves at the center a free square whose area tends to zero as k tends to infinity. At the limit, the infinite Fibonacci tile tiles the plane.
- If the tile is enclosed in a square of side 1, then its area tends to $2-\sqrt{2} = 0.5857$.

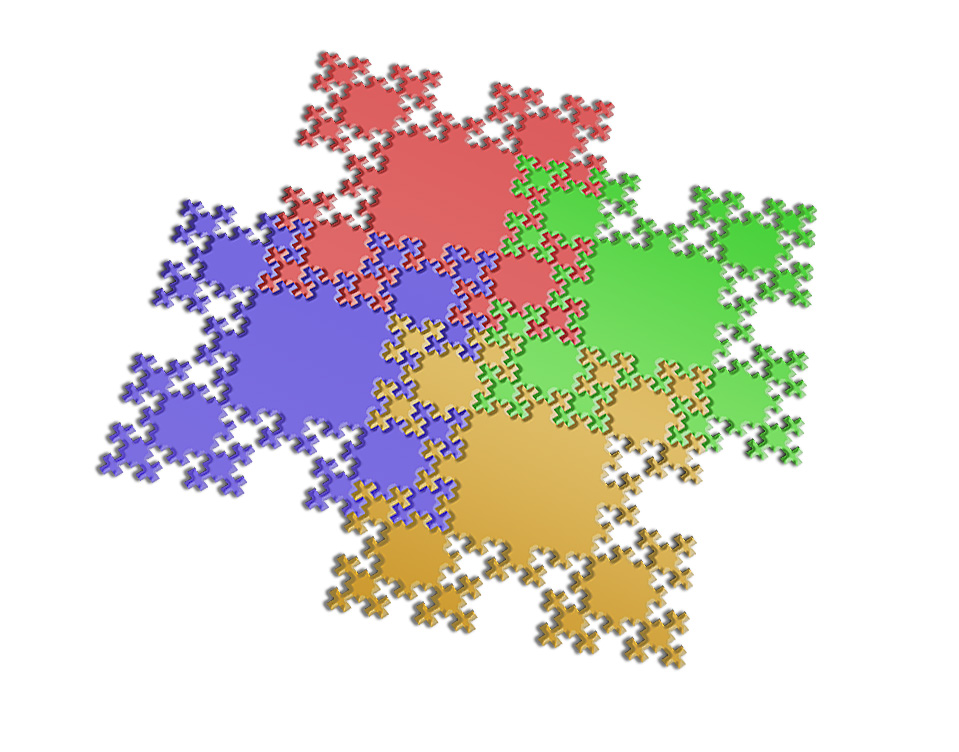
Perfect tiling by the Fibonacci snowflake

=== Fibonacci snowflake ===
Fibonacci snowflakes for i = 2 for n = 1 through 4: $\sideset{}{_1^\left [ 2 \right ] \quad}\prod$, $\sideset{}{_2^\left [ 2 \right ] \quad}\prod$, $\sideset{}{_3^\left [ 2 \right ] \quad}\prod$, $\sideset{}{_4^\left [ 2 \right ] \quad}\prod$

The Fibonacci snowflake is a Fibonacci tile defined by:

- $q_n = q_{n-1}q_{n-2}$ if $n \equiv 2 \pmod 3$
- $q_n = q_{n-1}\overline{q}_{n-2}$ otherwise.

with $q_0=\epsilon$ and $q_1=R$, $L =$ "turn left" and $R =$ "turn right", and $\overline{R} = L$.

Several remarkable properties:

- It is the Fibonacci tile associated to the "diagonal variant" previously defined.
- It tiles the plane at any order.
- It tiles the plane by translation in two different ways.
- its perimeter at order n equals $4F(3n+1)$, where $F(n)$ is the n^{th} Fibonacci number.
- its area at order n follows the successive indexes of odd row of the Pell sequence (defined by $P(n)=2P(n-1)+P(n-2)$).

== See also ==
- Golden ratio
- Fibonacci number
- Fibonacci word
- List of fractals by Hausdorff dimension
