= Fractal curve =

Mathematical curve whose shape is a fractal

Construction of the Gosper curve

A fractal curve is loosely a mathematical curve whose shape retains the same general pattern of irregularity, regardless of how high it is magnified or scaled, that is, its graph is either space-filling or takes the form of a fractal.

In general, fractal curves are nowhere rectifiable — that is, they do not have finite length — and every subarc longer than a single point has infinite length. A famous example is the boundary of the Mandelbrot set.

== In nature ==
Fractal curves and fractal patterns are widespread in nature, found in such places as broccoli, snowflakes, feet of geckos, frost crystals, and lightning bolts.

See also Romanesco broccoli, dendrite crystal, trees, fractals, Hofstadter's butterfly, Lichtenberg figure, and self-organized criticality.

== Dimension ==
Mathematical curves are one dimensional spaces. However, fractal curves have different fractal dimension or Hausdorff dimension (see list of fractals by Hausdorff dimension).

Zooming in on the Mandelbrot set

== Relationship to other fields ==
Starting in the 1950s, Benoit Mandelbrot and others have studied self-similarity of fractal curves, and have applied theory of fractals to modelling natural phenomena. Self-similarity occurs, and analysis of these patterns has found fractal curves in such diverse fields as economics, fluid mechanics, geomorphology, human physiology and linguistics.

As examples, "landscapes" revealed by microscopic views of surfaces in connection with Brownian motion, vascular networks, and shapes of polymer molecules all relate to fractal curves.

== Examples ==
- Blancmange curve
- Coastline paradox
- De Rham curve
- Dragon curve
- Fibonacci word fractal
- Koch snowflake
- Boundary of the Mandelbrot set
- Menger sponge
- Peano curve
- Sierpiński triangle
- Weierstrass function

== See also ==
- The Beauty of Fractals
- Fractal antenna
- Fractal expressionism
- Fractal landscape
- Hexaflake
- Mosely snowflake
- Newton fractal
- Orbit trap
- Quasicircle
- The Fractal Geometry of Nature
