= Multifractal system =

System with multiple fractal dimensions

A strange attractor that exhibits multifractal scaling

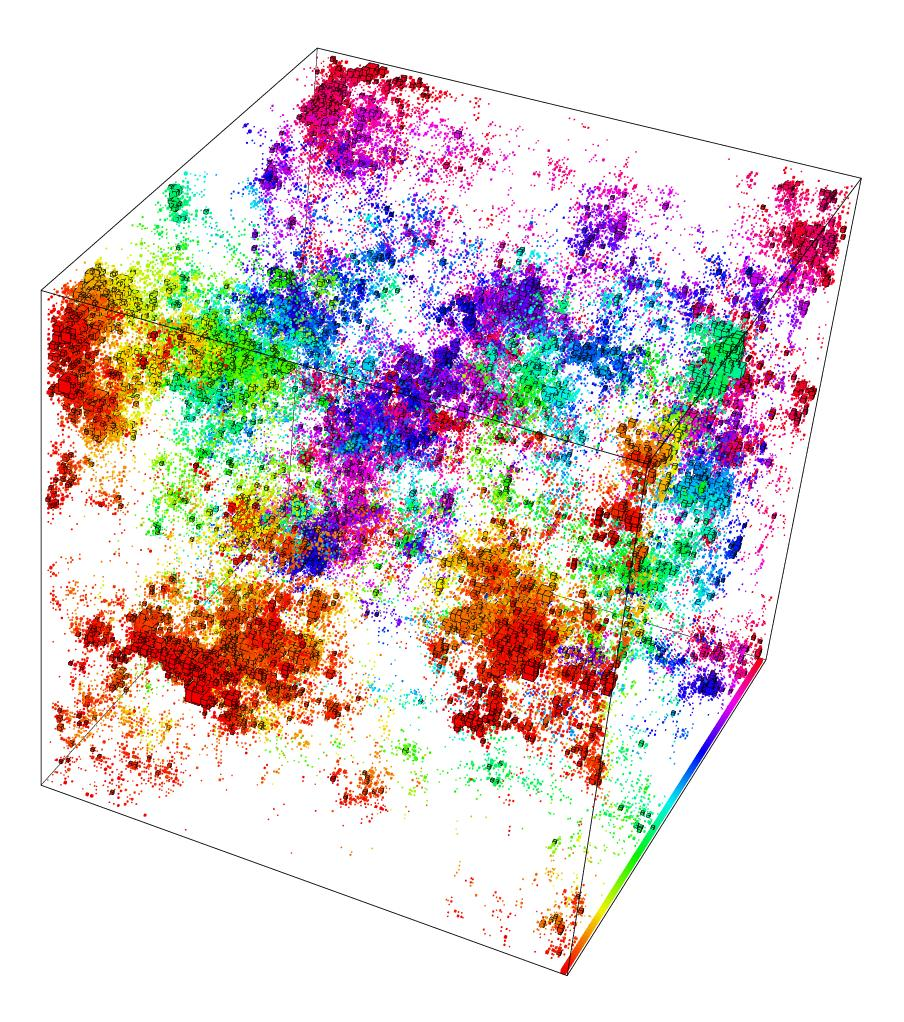
Example of a multifractal electronic eigenstate at the Anderson localization transition in a system with 1367631 atoms.

A multifractal system is a generalization of a fractal system in which a single exponent (the fractal dimension) is not enough to describe its dynamics; instead, a continuous spectrum of exponents (the so-called singularity spectrum) is needed.

Multifractal systems are common in nature. They include the length of coastlines, mountain topography, fully developed turbulence, natural luminosity time series, and real-world scenes. Models have been proposed in various contexts ranging from turbulence in fluid dynamics to internet traffic, finance, image modeling, texture synthesis, meteorology, geophysics and more. The origin of multifractality in sequential (time series) data has been attributed to mathematical convergence effects related to the central limit theorem that have as foci of convergence the family of statistical distributions known as the Tweedie exponential dispersion models, as well as the geometric Tweedie models. The first convergence effect yields monofractal sequences, and the second convergence effect is responsible for variation in the fractal dimension of the monofractal sequences.

Multifractal analysis is used to investigate datasets, often in conjunction with other methods of fractal and lacunarity analysis. The technique entails distorting datasets extracted from patterns to generate multifractal spectra that illustrate how scaling varies over the dataset. Multifractal analysis has been used to decipher the generating rules and functionalities of complex networks. Multifractal analysis techniques have been applied in a variety of practical situations, such as predicting earthquakes and interpreting medical images.

== Definition ==
In a multifractal system $s$, the behavior around any point is described by a local power law:

$$s(\vec{x}+\vec{a})-s(\vec{x}) \sim a^{h(\vec{x})}.$$

The exponent $h(\vec{x})$ is called the singularity exponent, as it describes the local degree of singularity or regularity around the point $\vec{x}$.

The ensemble formed by all the points that share the same singularity exponent is called the singularity manifold of exponent h, and is a fractal set of fractal dimension $D(h):$ the singularity spectrum. The curve $D(h)$ versus $h$ is called the singularity spectrum and fully describes the statistical distribution of the variable $s$.

In practice, the multifractal behaviour of a physical system $X$ is not directly characterized by its singularity spectrum $D(h)$. Rather, data analysis gives access to the multiscaling exponents $\zeta(q),\ q\in{\mathbb R}$. Indeed, multifractal signals generally obey a scale invariance property that yields power-law behaviours for multiresolution quantities, depending on their scale $a$. Depending on the object under study, these multiresolution quantities, denoted by $T_X(a)$, can be local averages in boxes of size $a$, gradients over distance $a$, wavelet coefficients at scale $a$, etc. For multifractal objects, one usually observes a global power-law scaling of the form:

$$\langle T_X(a)^q \rangle \sim a^{\zeta(q)}\$$

at least in some range of scales and for some range of orders $q$. When such behaviour is observed, one talks of scale invariance, self-similarity, or multiscaling.

== Estimation ==
Using so-called multifractal formalism, it can be shown that, under some well-suited assumptions, there exists a correspondence between the singularity spectrum $D(h)$ and the multi-scaling exponents $\zeta(q)$ through a Legendre transform. While the determination of $D(h)$ calls for some exhaustive local analysis of the data, which would result in difficult and numerically unstable calculations, the estimation of the $\zeta(q)$ relies on the use of statistical averages and linear regressions in log-log diagrams. Once the $\zeta(q)$ are known, one can deduce an estimate of $D(h),$ thanks to a simple Legendre transform.

Multifractal systems are often modeled by stochastic processes such as multiplicative cascades. The $\zeta(q)$ are statistically interpreted, as they characterize the evolution of the distributions of the $T_X(a)$ as $a$ goes from larger to smaller scales. This evolution is often called statistical intermittency and betrays a departure from Gaussian models.

Modelling as a multiplicative cascade also leads to estimation of multifractal properties. This methods works reasonably well, even for relatively small datasets. A maximum likely fit of a multiplicative cascade to the dataset not only estimates the complete spectrum but also gives reasonable estimates of the errors.

== Estimating multifractal scaling from box counting ==
Multifractal spectra can be determined from box counting on digital images. First, a box counting scan is done to determine how the pixels are distributed; then, this "mass distribution" becomes the basis for a series of calculations. The chief idea is that for multifractals, the probability $P$ of a number of pixels $m$, appearing in a box $i$, varies as box size $\epsilon$, to some exponent $\alpha$, which changes over the image, as in Eq.0.0 (NB: For monofractals, in contrast, the exponent does not change meaningfully over the set). $P$ is calculated from the box-counting pixel distribution as in Eq.2.0.

$P_{[i,\epsilon]} \varpropto \epsilon^{-\alpha_i} \therefore\alpha_i \varpropto \frac{\log{P_{[i,\epsilon]}}}{\log{\epsilon^{-1}}}$	Eq.0.0

$\epsilon$ = an arbitrary scale (box size in box counting) at which the set is examined

$i$ = the index for each box laid over the set for an $\epsilon$

$m_{[i,\epsilon]}$ = the number of pixels or mass in any box, $i$, at size $\epsilon$

$N_\epsilon$ = the total boxes that contained more than 0 pixels, for each $\epsilon$

$M_\epsilon = \sum_{i=1}^{N_\epsilon}m_{[i,\epsilon]} =$ the total mass or sum of pixels in all boxes for this $\epsilon$	Eq.1.0

$P_{[i,\epsilon]} = \frac{m_{[i,\epsilon]}}{M_\epsilon} =$ the probability of this mass at $i$ relative to the total mass for a box size	Eq.2.0

$P$ is used to observe how the pixel distribution behaves when distorted in certain ways as in Eq.3.0 and Eq.3.1:

$Q$ = an arbitrary range of values to use as exponents for distorting the data set

$I_{{(Q)}_{[\epsilon]}} = \sum_{i=1}^{N_\epsilon} {P_{[i,\epsilon]}^Q} =$ the sum of all mass probabilities distorted by being raised to this Q, for this box size	Eq.3.0

- When $Q=1$, Eq.3.0 equals 1, the usual sum of all probabilities, and when $Q=0$, every term is equal to 1, so the sum is equal to the number of boxes counted, $N_\epsilon$.

$\mu_{{(Q)}_{[i,\epsilon]}} = \frac{P_{[i,\epsilon]}^Q}{I_{{(Q)}_{[\epsilon]}}} =$ how the distorted mass probability at a box compares to the distorted sum over all boxes at this box size	Eq.3.1

These distorting equations are further used to address how the set behaves when scaled or resolved or cut up into a series of $\epsilon$-sized pieces and distorted by Q, to find different values for the dimension of the set, as in the following:

- An important feature of Eq.3.0 is that it can also be seen to vary according to scale raised to the exponent $\tau$ in Eq.4.0:

$I_{{(Q)}_{[\epsilon]}} \varpropto \epsilon^{\tau_{(Q)}}$	Eq.4.0

Thus, a series of values for $\tau_{(Q)}$ can be found from the slopes of the regression line for the log of Eq.3.0 versus the log of $\epsilon$ for each $Q$, based on Eq.4.1:

$\tau_{(Q)} = {\lim_{\epsilon\to0}{\left[ \frac {\log{I_{{(Q)}_{[\epsilon]}}}} {\log{\epsilon}} \right ]}}$	Eq.4.1

- For the generalized dimension:

$D_{(Q)} = {\lim_{\epsilon\to0} { \left [ \frac{\log{I_{{(Q)}_{[\epsilon]}}}}{\log{\epsilon^{-1}}} \right ]}} {(1-Q)^{-1}}$	Eq.5.0

$D_{(Q)} = \frac{\tau_{(Q)}}{Q-1}$	Eq.5.1

$\tau_{{(Q)}_{}} = D_{(Q)}\left(Q-1\right)$	Eq.5.2

$\tau_{(Q)} = \alpha_{(Q)}Q - f_{\left(\alpha_{(Q)}\right)}$	Eq.5.3

- $\alpha_{(Q)}$ is estimated as the slope of the regression line for $\log{A_{\epsilon,Q}}$ versus $\log{\epsilon}$ where:

$A_{\epsilon,Q} = \sum_{i=1}^{N_\epsilon}{\mu_{{i,\epsilon}_{Q}}{P_{{i,\epsilon}_{Q}}}}$	Eq.6.0

- Then $f_{\left(\alpha_{{(Q)}}\right)}$ is found from Eq.5.3.

- The mean $\tau_{(Q)}$ is estimated as the slope of the log-log regression line for $\tau_{{(Q)}_{[\epsilon]}}$ versus $\epsilon$, where:

$\tau_{(Q)_{[\epsilon]}} = \frac{\sum_{i=1}^{N_\epsilon} {P_{[i,\epsilon]}^{Q-1}}} {N_\epsilon}$	Eq.6.1

In practice, the probability distribution depends on how the dataset is sampled, so optimizing algorithms have been developed to ensure adequate sampling.

== Applications ==
Multifractal analysis has been successfully used in many fields, including physical, information, and biological sciences. For example, the quantification of residual crack patterns on the surface of reinforced concrete shear walls.

=== Dataset distortion analysis ===
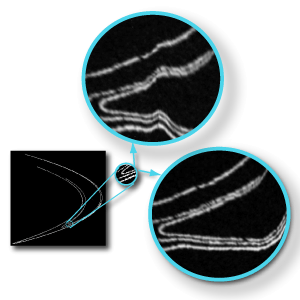
Multifractal analysis is analogous to viewing a dataset through a series of distorting lenses to home in on differences in scaling. The pattern shown is a Hénon map.

Multifractal analysis has been used in several scientific fields to characterize various types of datasets. In essence, multifractal analysis applies a distorting factor to datasets extracted from patterns, to compare how the data behave at each distortion. This is done using graphs known as multifractal spectra, analogous to viewing the dataset through a "distorting lens", as shown in the illustration. Several types of multifractal spectra are used in practise.

==== D_{Q} vs Q ====
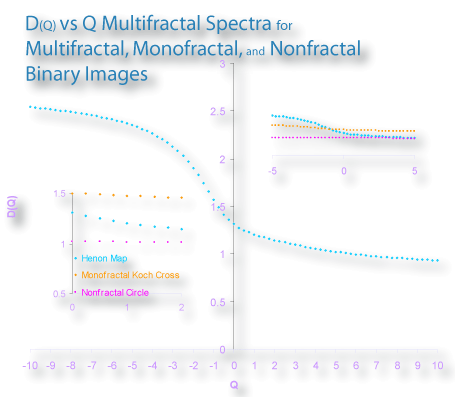
D_{Q} vs Q spectra for a non-fractal circle (empirical box counting dimension = 1.0), mono-fractal Quadric Cross (empirical box counting dimension = 1.49), and multifractal Hénon map (empirical box counting dimension = 1.29).

One practical multifractal spectrum is the graph of D_{Q} vs Q, where D_{Q} is the generalized dimension for a dataset and Q is an arbitrary set of exponents. The expression generalized dimension thus refers to a set of dimensions for a dataset (detailed calculations for determining the generalized dimension using box counting are described below).

==== Dimensional ordering ====
The general pattern of the graph of D_{Q} vs Q can be used to assess the scaling in a pattern. The graph is generally decreasing, sigmoidal around Q=0, where D_{(Q=0)} ≥ D_{(Q=1)} ≥ D_{(Q=2)}. As illustrated in the figure, variation in this graphical spectrum can help distinguish patterns. The image shows D_{(Q)} spectra from a multifractal analysis of binary images of non-, mono-, and multi-fractal sets. As is the case in the sample images, non- and mono-fractals tend to have flatter D_{(Q)} spectra than multifractals.

The generalized dimension also gives important specific information. D_{(Q=0)} is equal to the capacity dimension, which—in the analysis shown in the figures here—is the box counting dimension. D_{(Q=1)} is equal to the information dimension, and D_{(Q=2)} to the correlation dimension. This relates to the "multi" in multifractal, where multifractals have multiple dimensions in the D_{(Q)} versus Q spectra, but monofractals stay rather flat in that area.

==== f(α) versus α ====
Another useful multifractal spectrum is the graph of $f(\alpha)$ versus $\alpha$ (see calculations). These graphs generally rise to a maximum that approximates the fractal dimension at Q=0, and then fall. Like D_{Q} versus Q spectra, they also show typical patterns useful for comparing non-, mono-, and multi-fractal patterns. In particular, for these spectra, non- and mono-fractals converge on certain values, whereas the spectra from multifractal patterns typically form humps over a broader area.

=== Generalized dimensions of species abundance distributions in space ===
One application of D_{q} versus Q in ecology is characterizing the distribution of species. Traditionally the relative species abundances is calculated for an area without taking into account the locations of the individuals. An equivalent representation of relative species abundances are species ranks, used to generate a surface called the species-rank surface, which can be analyzed using generalized dimensions to detect different ecological mechanisms like the ones observed in the neutral theory of biodiversity, metacommunity dynamics, or niche theory.

== See also ==
- de Rham curve – Continuous fractal curve obtained as the image of Cantor space
- Fractional Brownian motion – Probability theory concept
- Detrended fluctuation analysis – Method to detect power-law scaling in time series
- Tweedie distributions – Family of probability distributions
- Markov switching multifractal – Model of asset returns
