= Box-counting content =

In mathematics, the box-counting content is an analog of Minkowski content.

== Definition ==
Let $A$ be a bounded subset of $m$-dimensional Euclidean space $\mathbb{R}^m$ such that the box-counting dimension $D_B$ exists. The upper and lower box-counting contents of $A$ are defined by

$$\mathcal{B}^*(A) := \limsup_{x \rightarrow \infty}
\frac{N_B(A, x)}{x^{D_B}}\quad\quad \text{and}
\quad\quad \mathcal{B}_*(A) := \liminf_{x \rightarrow \infty}
\frac{N_B(A, x)}{x^{D_B}}$$

where $N_B(A, x)$ is the maximum number of disjoint closed balls with centers $a\in A$ and radii $x^{-1} > 0$.

If $\mathcal{B}^*(A) = \mathcal{B}_*(A)$, then the common value, denoted $\mathcal{B}(A)$, is called the box-counting content of $A$.

If $0 < \mathcal{B}_*(A) < \mathcal{B}^*(A) < \infty$, then $A$ is said to be box-counting measurable.

== Examples ==
Let $I=[0,1]$ denote the unit interval. Note that the box-counting dimension $\dim_BI$ and the Minkowski dimension $\dim_MI$ coincide with a common value of 1; i.e.

$$\dim_BI=\dim_MI=1.$$

Now observe that $N_B(I, x) = \lfloor x/2\rfloor + 1$, where $\lfloor y \rfloor$ denotes the integer part of $y$. Hence $I$ is box-counting measurable with $\mathcal{B}(I) = 1/2$.

By contrast, $I$ is Minkowski measurable with $\mathcal{M}(I) = 1$.

== See also ==
- Box counting
