= The Fractal Dimension of Architecture =

- First edition
- Author: Michael J. Ostwald, Josephine Vaughan
- Series: Mathematics and the Built Environment
- Subject: Fractal Dimension
- Genre: Architecture
- Publisher: Birkhäuser
- Publication date: 2016

The Fractal Dimension of Architecture is a book that applies the mathematical concept of fractal dimension to the analysis of the architecture of buildings. It was written by Michael J. Ostwald and Josephine Vaughan, both of whom are architecture academics at the University of Newcastle (Australia); it was published in 2016 by Birkhäuser, as the first volume in their Mathematics and the Built Environment book series.

== Topics ==
The book applies the box counting method for computing fractal dimension, via the ArchImage software system, to compute a fractal dimension from architectural drawings (elevations and floor plans) of buildings, drawn at multiple levels of detail. The results of the book suggest that the results are consistent enough to allow for comparisons from one building to another, as long as the general features of the images (such as margins, line thickness, and resolution), parameters of the box counting algorithm, and statistical processing of the results are carefully controlled.

The first five chapters of the book introduce fractals and the fractal dimension, and explain the methodology used by the authors for this analysis, also applying the same analysis to classical fractal structures including the Apollonian gasket, Fibonacci word, Koch snowflake, Minkowski sausage, pinwheel tiling, terdragon, and Sierpiński triangle. The remaining six chapters explain the authors' choice of buildings to analyze, apply their methodology to 625 drawings from 85 homes, built between 1901 and 2007, and perform a statistical analysis of the results.

The authors use this technique to study three main hypotheses, with a fractal structure of subsidiary hypotheses depending on them. These are

- That the decrease in the complexity of social family units over the period of study should have led to a corresponding decrease in the complexity of their homes, as measured by a reduction in the fractal dimension.
- That distinctive genres and movements in architecture can be characterized by their fractal dimensions, and
- That individual architects can also be characterized by the fractal dimensions of their designs.

The first and third hypotheses are not convincingly supported by the analysis, but the results suggest further work in these directions. The second hypothesis, on distinctive fractal descriptions of genres and movements, does not appear to be true, leading the authors to weaker replacements for it.

== Audience and reception ==
The book is aimed at architects and architecture students; its mathematical content is not deep, and it does not require much mathematical background of its readers. Reviewer Joel Haack suggests that it could also be used for general education courses in mathematics for liberal arts undergraduates.
