= Multiplicative cascade =

Fractal distribution of random points

In mathematics, a multiplicative cascade is a fractal/multifractal distribution of points produced via an iterative and multiplicative random process.

== Definition ==
The plots above are examples of multiplicative cascade multifractals.

To create these distributions there are a few steps to take. Firstly, we must create a lattice of cells which will be our underlying probability density field.

Secondly, an iterative process is followed to create multiple levels of the lattice: at each iteration the cells are split into four equal parts (cells). Each new cell is then assigned a probability randomly from the set $\lbrace p_1,p_2,p_3,p_4 \rbrace$ without replacement, where $p_i \in [0,1]$. This process is continued to the Nth level. For example, in constructing such a model down to level 8 we produce a 4^{8} array of cells.

Thirdly, the cells are filled as follows: We take the probability of a cell being occupied as the product of the cell's own p_{i} and those of all its parents (up to level 1). A Monte Carlo rejection scheme is used repeatedly until the desired cell population is obtained, as follows: x and y cell coordinates are chosen randomly, and a random number between 0 and 1 is assigned; the (x, y) cell is then populated depending on whether the assigned number is lesser than (outcome: not populated) or greater or equal to (outcome: populated) the cell's occupation probability.

== Examples ==
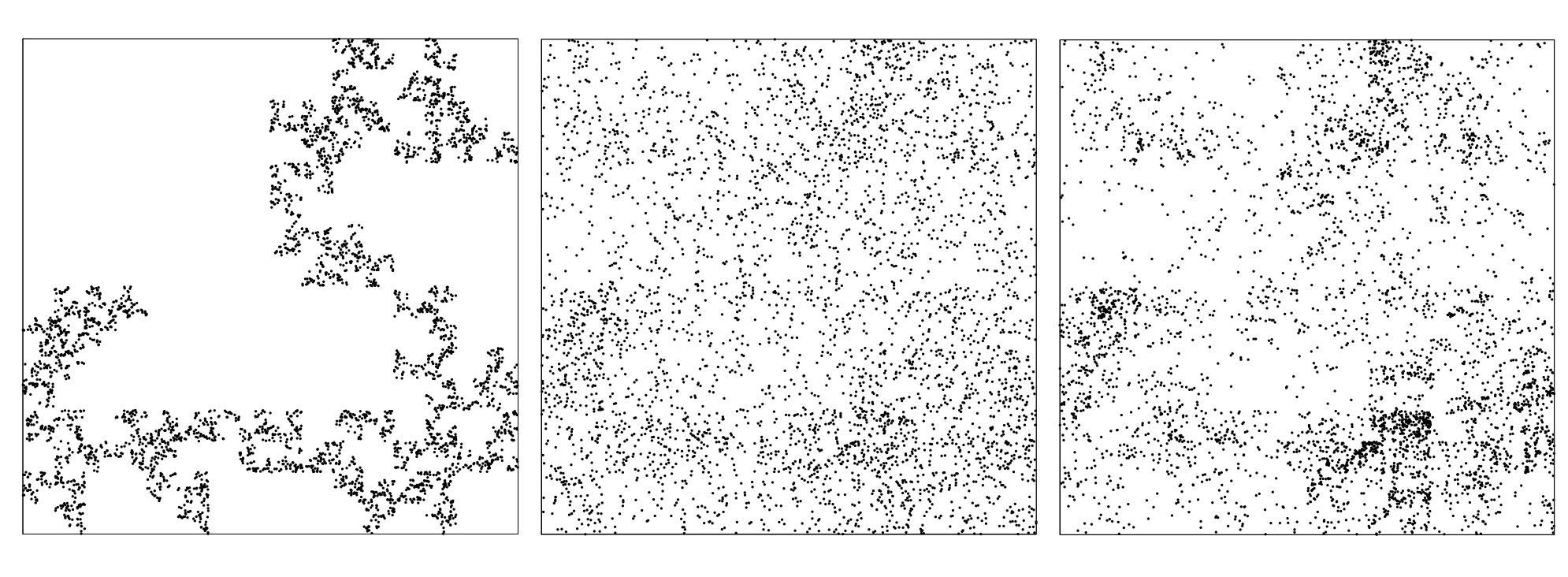
Three multiplicative cascades. Generators (left to right): $\lbrace p_1,p_2,p_3,p_4 \rbrace = \lbrace 1,1,1,0 \rbrace$, $\lbrace p_1,p_2,p_3,p_4 \rbrace = \lbrace 1,0.75,0.75,0.5 \rbrace$, $\lbrace p_1,p_2,p_3,p_4 \rbrace = \lbrace 1,0.5,0.5,0.25 \rbrace$

To produce the plots above, the probability density field is filled with 5,000 points in a space of 256 × 256.

An example of the probability density field:

The fractals are generally not scale-invariant and therefore cannot be considered standard fractals. They can however be considered multifractals. The Rényi (generalized) dimensions can be theoretically predicted. It can be shown that as $N \rightarrow \infty$,

$$D_q=\frac{\log_2\left( f^q_1+f^q_2+f^q_3+f^q_4\right)}{1-q},$$

where N is the level of the grid refinement and,

$$f_i=\frac{p_i}{\sum_i p_i}.$$

== See also ==
- Fractal dimension
- Hausdorff dimension
- Scale invariance
