= Assouad dimension =

The Assouad dimension of the Sierpiński triangle is equal to its Hausdorff dimension, $\alpha = \frac{\log(3)}{\log(2)}$. In the illustration, we see that for a particular choice of r, R, and x, $$N_{r}(B_{R}(x) \cap E) = 3 = 2^\alpha = \left( \frac{R}{r} \right)^{\alpha}.$$ For other choices, the constant C may be greater than 1, but is still bounded.

In mathematics — specifically, in fractal geometry — the Assouad dimension is a definition of fractal dimension for subsets of a metric space. It was introduced by Patrice Assouad in his 1977 PhD thesis and later published in 1979, although the same notion had been studied in 1928 by Georges Bouligand. As well as being used to study fractals, the Assouad dimension has also been used to study quasiconformal mappings and embeddability problems.

== Definition ==
The Assouad dimension of $X, d_A(X)$, is the infimum of all $s$ such that $(X, \varsigma)$ is $(M, s)$-homogeneous for some $M \ge 1$.

Let $(X, d)$ be a metric space, and let E be a non-empty subset of X. For r > 0, let $N_{r}(E)$ denote the least number of metric open balls of radius less than or equal to r with which it is possible to cover the set E. The Assouad dimension of E is defined to be the infimal $\alpha \ge 0$ for which there exist positive constants C and $\rho$ so that, whenever
$$0 < r < R \leq \rho,$$
the following bound holds:
$$\sup_{x \in E} N_{r}(B_{R}(x) \cap E) \leq C \left( \frac{R}{r} \right)^{\alpha}.$$

The intuition underlying this definition is that, for a set E with "ordinary" integer dimension n, the number of small balls of radius r needed to cover the intersection of a larger ball of radius R with E will scale like (R/r)^{n}.

== Relationships to other notions of dimension ==
- The Assouad dimension of a metric space is always greater than or equal to its Assouad–Nagata dimension.
- The Assouad dimension of a metric space is always greater than or equal to its upper box dimension, which in turn is greater than or equal to the Hausdorff dimension.
- The Lebesgue covering dimension of a metrizable space X is the minimal Assouad dimension of any metric on X. In particular, for every metrizable space there is a metric for which the Assouad dimension is equal to the Lebesgue covering dimension.
