= Open set condition =

Condition for fractals in math

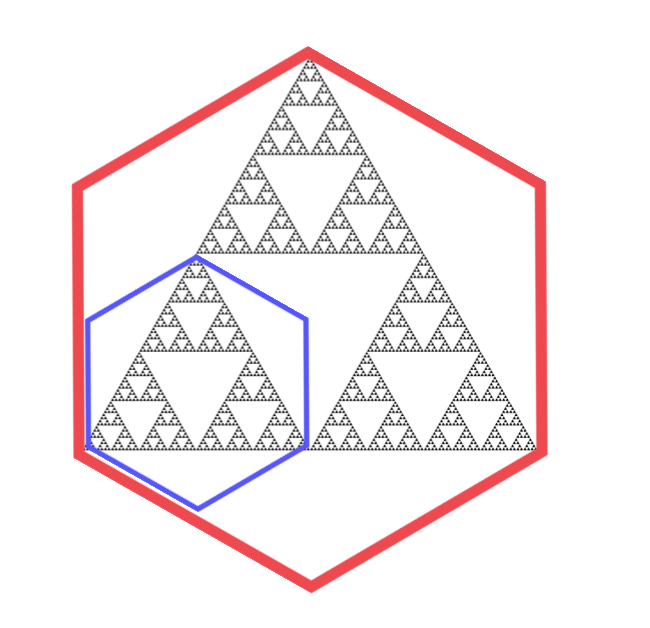
an open set covering of the sierpinski triangle along with one of its mappings ψ_{i}.

In fractal geometry, the open set condition (OSC) is a commonly imposed condition on self-similar fractals. In some sense, the condition imposes restrictions on the overlap in a fractal construction. Specifically, given an iterated function system of contractive mappings $\psi_1, \ldots, \psi_m$, the open set condition requires that there exists a nonempty, open set V satisfying two conditions:

1. $\bigcup_{i=1}^m\psi_i (V) \subseteq V,$
2. The sets $\psi_1(V), \ldots, \psi_m(V)$ are pairwise disjoint.

Introduced in 1946 by P.A.P Moran, the open set condition is used to compute the dimensions of certain self-similar fractals, notably the Sierpinski Gasket. It is also used to simplify computation of the packing measure.

An equivalent statement of the open set condition is to require that the s-dimensional Hausdorff measure of the set is greater than zero.

== Computing Hausdorff dimension ==
When the open set condition holds and each $\psi_i$ is a similitude (that is, a composition of an isometry and a dilation around some point), then the unique fixed point of $\psi$ is a set whose Hausdorff dimension is the unique solution for s of the following:

$$\sum_{i=1}^m r_i^s = 1.$$

where r_{i} is the magnitude of the dilation of the similitude.

With this theorem, the Hausdorff dimension of the Sierpinski gasket can be calculated. Consider three non-collinear points a_{1}, a_{2}, a_{3} in the plane R^{2} and let $\psi_i$ be the dilation of ratio 1/2 around a_{i}. The unique non-empty fixed point of the corresponding mapping $\psi$ is a Sierpinski gasket, and the dimension s is the unique solution of

$$\left(\frac{1}{2}\right)^s+\left(\frac{1}{2}\right)^s+\left(\frac{1}{2}\right)^s = 3 \left(\frac{1}{2}\right)^s =1.$$

Taking natural logarithms of both sides of the above equation, we can solve for s, that is: s = ln(3)/ln(2). The Sierpinski gasket is self-similar and satisfies the OSC.

== Strong open set condition ==
The strong open set condition (SOSC) is an extension of the open set condition. A fractal F satisfies the SOSC if, in addition to satisfying the OSC, the intersection between F and the open set V is nonempty. The two conditions are equivalent for self-similar and self-conformal sets, but not for certain classes of other sets, such as function systems with infinite mappings and in non-euclidean metric spaces. In these cases, SOCS is indeed a stronger condition.

== See also ==
- Cantor set
- List of fractals by Hausdorff dimension
- Minkowski–Bouligand dimension
- Packing dimension
