= Correlation sum =

In chaos theory, the correlation sum is the estimator of the correlation integral, which reflects the mean probability that the states at two different times are close:

$$C(\varepsilon) = \frac{1}{N^2} \sum_{\stackrel{i,j=1}{i \neq j}}^N \Theta(\varepsilon - \| \vec{x}(i) - \vec{x}(j)\|), \quad \vec{x}(i) \in \mathbb{R}^m,$$

where $N$ is the number of considered states $\vec{x}(i)$, $\varepsilon$ is a threshold distance, $\| \cdot \|$ a norm (e.g. Euclidean norm) and $\Theta( \cdot )$ the Heaviside step function. If only a time series is available, the phase space can be reconstructed by using a time delay embedding (see Takens' theorem):

$$\vec{x}(i) = (u(i), u(i+\tau), \ldots, u(i+\tau(m-1)),$$

where $u(i)$ is the time series, $m$ the embedding dimension and $\tau$ the time delay.

The correlation sum is used to estimate the correlation dimension.

== See also ==
- Recurrence quantification analysis
