= Singularity spectrum =

Mathematical function

The singularity spectrum is a function used in multifractal analysis to describe the fractal dimension of a subset of points of a function belonging to a group of points that have the same Hölder exponent. Intuitively, the singularity spectrum gives a value for how "fractal" a set of points are in a function.

More formally, the singularity spectrum $D(\alpha)$ of a function, $f(x)$, is defined as:

$$D(\alpha) = D_F\{x, \alpha(x) = \alpha\}$$

Where $\alpha(x)$ is the function describing the Hölder exponent, $\alpha(x)$ of $f(x)$ at the point $x$. $D_F\{\cdot\}$ is the Hausdorff dimension of a point set.

== See also ==
- Fractal
- Fractional Brownian motion
- Hausdorff dimension
