= Higuchi dimension =

Fractal geometry concept

In fractal geometry, the Higuchi dimension (or Higuchi fractal dimension (HFD)) is an approximate value for the box-counting dimension of the graph of a real-valued function or time series. This value is obtained via an algorithmic approximation so one also talks about the Higuchi method. It has many applications in science and engineering and has been applied to subjects like characterizing primary waves in seismograms, clinical neurophysiology and analyzing changes in the electroencephalogram in Alzheimer's disease.

== Formulation of the method ==
The original formulation of the method is due to T. Higuchi. Given a time series $X:\{1, \dots, N \} \to \mathbb{R}$ consisting of $N$ data points and a parameter $k_{\mathrm{max}} \geq 2$ the Higuchi Fractal dimension (HFD) of $X$ is calculated in the following way: For each $k \in \{ 1, \dots, k_{\mathrm{max}} }\$ and $m \in \{1, \dots, k}\$ define the length $L_m(k)$ by

$$L_m(k) = \frac{N-1}{\lfloor \frac{N-m}{k} \rfloor k^2} \sum_{i=1}^{\lfloor \frac{N-m}{k} \rfloor} |X_N(m+ik)-X_N(m+(i-1)k)|.$$

The length $L(k)$ is defined by the average value of the $k$ lengths $L_1(k), \dots, L_k(k)$,

$$L(k) = \frac{1}{k} \sum_{m=1}^k L_m(k).$$

The slope of the best-fitting linear function through the data points $\left \{ \left ( \log \frac{1}{k} ,\log L(k) \right ) \right \}$ is defined to be the Higuchi fractal dimension of the time-series $X$.

== Application to functions ==
For a real-valued function $f:[0,1] \to \mathbb{R}$ one can partition the unit interval $[0,1]$ into $N$ equidistantly intervals $[t_j,t_{j+1})$ and apply the Higuchi algorithm to the times series $X(j) = f(t_j)$. This results into the Higuchi fractal dimension of the function $f$. It was shown that in this case the Higuchi method yields an approximation for the box-counting dimension of the graph of $f$ as it follows a geometrical approach (see Liehr & Massopust 2020).

== Robustness and stability ==
Applications to fractional Brownian functions and the Weierstrass function reveal that the Higuchi fractal dimension can be close to the box-dimension. On the other hand, the method can be unstable in the case where the data $X(1), \dots, X(N)$ are periodic or if subsets of it lie on a horizontal line (see Liehr & Massopust 2020).
