= Assouad–Nagata dimension =

In mathematics, the Assouad–Nagata dimension (sometimes simply Nagata dimension) is a notion of dimension for metric spaces, introduced by Jun-iti Nagata in 1958 and reformulated by Patrice Assouad in 1982, who introduced the now-usual definition.

== Definition ==
The Assouad–Nagata dimension of a metric space (X, d) is defined as the smallest integer n for which there exists a constant C > 0 such that for all r > 0 the space X has a Cr-bounded covering with r-multiplicity at most n + 1. Here Cr-bounded means that the diameter of each set of the covering is bounded by Cr, and r-multiplicity is the infimum of integers k ≥ 0 such that each subset of X with diameter at most r has a non-empty intersection with at most k members of the covering.

This definition can be rephrased to make it more similar to that of the Lebesgue covering dimension. The Assouad–Nagata dimension of a metric space (X, d) is the smallest integer n for which there exists a constant c > 0 such that for every r > 0, the covering of X by r-balls has a refinement with cr-multiplicity at most n + 1.

== Relationship to other notions of dimension ==
Compare the similar definitions of Lebesgue covering dimension and asymptotic dimension. A space has Lebesgue covering dimension at most n if it is at most n-dimensional at microscopic scales, and asymptotic dimension at most n if it looks at most n-dimensional upon zooming out as far as you need. To have Assouad–Nagata dimension at most n, a space has to look at most n-dimensional at every possible scale, in a uniform way across scales.

The Nagata dimension of a metric space is always less than or equal to its Assouad dimension.
