= Parabolic Hausdorff dimension =

Type of fractal dimension

In fractal geometry, the parabolic Hausdorff dimension is a restricted version of the genuine Hausdorff dimension. Only parabolic cylinders, i. e. rectangles with a distinct non-linear scaling between time and space are permitted as covering sets. It is useful to determine the Hausdorff dimension of self-similar stochastic processes, such as the geometric Brownian motion or stable Lévy processes plus Borel measurable drift function $f$.

== Definitions ==
We define the $\alpha$-parabolic $\beta$-Hausdorff outer measure for any set $A \subseteq \R^{d+1}$ as

$$\mathcal{P}^\alpha-\mathcal{H}^\beta (A) := \lim_{\delta \downarrow 0} \inf \left \{ \sum_{k=1}^\infty \left | P_k \right |^\beta: A \subseteq \bigcup_{k=1}^\infty P_k, P_k \in \mathcal{P}^\alpha, \left | P_k \right | \leq \delta \right \}.$$

where the $\alpha$-parabolic cylinders $\left ( P_k \right )_{k \in \mathbb{N}}$ are contained in

$$\mathcal{P}^\alpha := \left \{ [t,t+c] \times \prod_{i=1}^d \left [ x_i, x_i + c^{1/\alpha} \right ]; t, x_i \in \mathbb{R}, c \in (0,1] \right \}.$$

We define the $\alpha$-parabolic Hausdorff dimension of $A$ as

$$\mathcal{P}^\alpha-\dim A := \inf \left \{ \beta \geq 0: \mathcal{P}^\alpha-\mathcal{H}^\beta (A) = 0 \right \}.$$

The case $\alpha = 1$ equals the genuine Hausdorff dimension $\dim$.

== Application ==
Let $\varphi_\alpha := \mathcal{P}^\alpha-\dim \mathcal{G}_T(f)$. We can calculate the Hausdorff dimension of the fractional Brownian motion $B^H$ of Hurst index $1/\alpha = H \in (0,1]$ plus some measurable drift function $f$. We get

$$\dim \mathcal{G}_T \left (B^H+f \right ) = \varphi_\alpha \wedge \frac{1}{\alpha} \cdot \varphi_{\alpha} + \left (1 - \frac{1}{\alpha} \right) \cdot d$$

and

$$\dim \mathcal{R}_T \left (B^H +f \right ) = \varphi_\alpha \wedge d.$$

For an isotropic $\alpha$-stable Lévy process $X$ for $\alpha \in (0,2]$ plus some measurable drift function $f$ we get

$$\dim \mathcal{G}_T(X+f) =
\begin{cases}
\varphi_1, & \alpha \in (0,1], \\
\varphi_\alpha \wedge \frac{1}{\alpha} \cdot \varphi_\alpha + \left ( 1 - \frac{1}{\alpha} \right ) \cdot d, & \alpha \in [1,2]
\end{cases}$$

and

$$\dim \mathcal{R}_T \left ( X + f \right ) =
\begin{cases}
\alpha \cdot \varphi_\alpha \wedge d, & \alpha \in (0,1], \\
\varphi_\alpha \wedge d, & \alpha \in [1,2].
\end{cases}$$

== Inequalities and identities ==
For $\phi_\alpha := \mathcal{P}^\alpha-\dim A$ one has

$$\dim A \leq
\begin{cases}
\phi_\alpha \wedge \alpha \cdot \phi_\alpha + 1 - \alpha, & \alpha \in (0,1], \\
\phi_\alpha \wedge \frac{1}{\alpha} \cdot \alpha + \left ( 1 - \frac{1}{\alpha} \right ) \cdot d, & \alpha \in [1,\infty)
\end{cases}$$

and

$$\dim A \geq
\begin{cases}
\alpha \cdot \phi_\alpha \vee \phi_\alpha + \left ( 1 - \frac{1}{\alpha} \right ) \cdot d, & \alpha \in (0,1], \\
\phi_\alpha + 1 - \alpha, & \alpha \in [1,\infty).
\end{cases}$$

Further, for the fractional Brownian motion $B^H$ of Hurst index $1/\alpha = H \in (0,1]$ one has

$$\mathcal{P}^\alpha-\dim \mathcal{G}_T \left (B^H \right ) = \alpha \cdot \dim T$$

and for an isotropic $\alpha$-stable Lévy process $X$ for $\alpha \in (0,2]$ one has

$$\mathcal{P}^\alpha-\dim \mathcal{G}_T \left (X \right ) = (\alpha \vee 1) \cdot \dim T$$

and

$$\dim \mathcal{R}_T(X) = \alpha \cdot \dim T \wedge d.$$

For constant functions $f_C$ we get

$$\mathcal{P}^\alpha-\dim \mathcal{G}_T \left (f_C \right ) = (\alpha \vee 1) \cdot \dim T.$$

If $f \in C^\beta(T,\mathbb{R}^d)$, i. e. $f$ is $\beta$-Hölder continuous, for $\varphi_\alpha = \mathcal{P}^\alpha-\dim \mathcal{G}_T(f)$ the estimates

$$\varphi_\alpha \leq
\begin{cases}
\dim T + \left ( \frac{1}{\alpha} - \beta \right ) \cdot d \wedge \frac{\dim T}{\alpha \cdot \beta} \wedge d + 1, & \alpha \in (0,1], \\
\alpha \cdot \dim T + (1 - \alpha \cdot \beta) \cdot d \wedge \frac{\dim T}{\beta} \wedge d + 1, & \alpha \in \left [1,\frac{1}{\beta} \right ],\\
\alpha \cdot \dim T + \frac{1}{\beta}(\dim T -1) + \alpha \wedge d + 1, & \alpha \in \left [\frac{1}{\beta}, \infty) \right ]
\end{cases}$$

hold.

Finally, for the Brownian motion $B$ and $f \in C^\beta \left (T,\mathbb{R}^d \right )$ we get

$$\dim \mathcal{G}_T(B + f) \leq
\begin{cases}
d + \frac{1}{2}, & \beta \leq \frac{\dim T}{d} - \frac{1}{2d},\\
\dim T + (1 - \beta) \cdot d, & \frac{\dim T}{d} - \frac{1}{2d} \leq \beta \leq \frac{\dim T}{d} \wedge \frac{1}{2},\\
\frac{\dim T}{\beta}, & \frac{\dim T}{d} \leq \beta \leq \frac{1}{2},\\
2 \cdot \dim T \wedge \dim T + \frac{d}{2}, & \text{ else}
\end{cases}$$

and

$$\dim \mathcal{R}_T(B + f) \leq
\begin{cases}
\frac{\dim T}{\beta}, & \frac{\dim T}{d} \leq \beta \leq \frac{1}{2},\\
2 \cdot \dim T \wedge d, & \frac{\dim T}{d} \leq \frac{1}{2} \leq \beta,\\
d, & \text{ else}.
\end{cases}$$

== Sources ==
- Kern, Peter; Pleschberger, Leonard (2024). "Parabolic Fractal Geometry of Stable Lévy Processes with Drift". arXiv:2312.13800 [math.PR].
- Peres, Yuval; Sousi, Perla (2016). "Dimension of fractional Brownian motion with variable drift". Probability Theory and Related Fields. 165 (3–4): 771–794. arXiv:1310.7002. doi:10.1007/s00440-015-0645-5.
- Taylor, S. J.; Watson, N. A. (1985). "A Hausdorff measure classification of polar sets for the heat equation". Mathematical Proceedings of the Cambridge Philosophical Society. 97 (2): 325–344. Bibcode:1985MPCPS..97..325T. doi:10.1017/S0305004100062873.
