= Fractal analysis =

Mathematical technique in data science

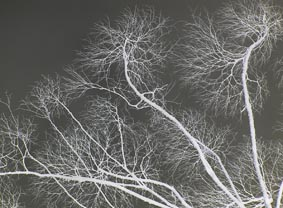
Fractal branching of trees

Fractal analysis is assessing fractal characteristics of data. It consists of several methods to assign a fractal dimension and other fractal characteristics to a dataset which may be a theoretical dataset, or a pattern or signal extracted from phenomena including topography, natural geometric objects, ecology and aquatic sciences, sound, market fluctuations, heart rates, frequency domain in electroencephalography signals, digital images, molecular motion, and data science. Fractal analysis is now widely used in all areas of science. An important limitation of fractal analysis is that arriving at an empirically determined fractal dimension does not necessarily prove that a pattern is fractal; rather, other essential characteristics have to be considered. Fractal analysis is valuable in expanding our knowledge of the structure and function of various systems, and as a potential tool to mathematically assess novel areas of study. Fractal calculus was formulated which is a generalization of ordinary calculus.

== Underlying principles ==
Fractals generally have fractional dimensions, which serve as a measure of complexity that indicates the degree to which the objects fill the available space. The fractal dimension measures the change in "size" of a fractal set with the changing observational scale, and is not limited by integer values. This is possible given that a smaller section of the fractal resembles the entirety, showing the same statistical properties at different scales. This characteristic is termed scale invariance, and can be further categorized as self-similarity or self-affinity, the latter scaled anisotropically (depending on the direction). Whether the view of the fractal is expanding or contracting, the structure remains the same and appears equivalently complex. Fractal analysis uses these underlying properties to help in the understanding and characterization of complex systems. It is also possible to expand the use of fractals to the lack of a single characteristic time scale, or pattern.

Further information on the Origins: Fractal Geometry

== Types of fractal analysis ==
There are various types of fractal analysis, including box counting, lacunarity analysis, mass methods, and multifractal analysis. A common feature of all types of fractal analysis is the need for benchmark patterns against which to assess outputs. These can be acquired with various types of fractal generating software capable of generating benchmark patterns suitable for this purpose, which generally differ from software designed to render fractal art. Other types include detrended fluctuation analysis and the Hurst absolute value method, which estimate the hurst exponent.

== Applications ==
=== Ecology and evolution ===
Unlike theoretical fractal curves which can be easily measured and the underlying mathematical properties calculated; natural systems are sources of heterogeneity and generate complex space-time structures that may only demonstrate partial self-similarity. Using fractal analysis, it is possible to analyze and recognize when features of complex ecological systems are altered since fractals are able to characterize the natural complexity in such systems. Thus, fractal analysis can help to quantify patterns in nature and to identify deviations from these natural sequences. It helps to improve our overall understanding of ecosystems and to reveal some of the underlying structural mechanisms of nature. For example, it was found that the structure of an individual tree's xylem follows the same architecture as the spatial distribution of the trees in the forest, and that the distribution of the trees in the forest shared the same underlying fractal structure as the branches, scaling identically to the point of being able to use the pattern of the trees' branches mathematically to determine the structure of the forest stand. The use of fractal analysis for understanding structures, and spatial and temporal complexity in biological systems has already been well studied and its use continues to increase in ecological research. Despite its extensive use, it still receives some criticism.

=== Architecture, urban design and landscape design ===
In his publication The Fractal Geometry of Nature, Benoit Mandelbrot suggested fractal theory could be applied to architecture. In this context, Mandelbrot was talking about the self-similar feature of fractal objects, rather than fractal analysis. In 1996, Carl Bovill applied the box counting method of fractal analysis to Architecture. Bovill's work, using a manual version of box counting, has since been refined by others and computational approaches have been developed.

Fractal analysis is one of the few quantitative analysis methods available to architects and designers to understand the visual complexity of buildings, urban areas and landscapes. Typical uses of fractal analysis of the built environment have been to understand the visual complexity of cities and skylines, the fractal dimensions of works of different architects and the landscape.

Combining the fractal analysis of ecology (see above) with fractal analysis of architecture, fractal dimensions have been used to explore the possible relationship between nature and architecture. Promising results suggest further research is needed in this area.

=== Animal behaviour ===
Patterns in animal behaviour exhibit fractal properties on spatial and temporal scales. Fractal analysis helps in understanding the behaviour of animals and how they interact with their environments on multiple scales in space and time. Various animal movement signatures in their respective environments have been found to demonstrate spatially non-linear fractal patterns. This has generated ecological interpretations such as the Lévy Flight Foraging hypothesis, which has proven to be a more accurate description of animal movement for some species.

Spatial patterns and animal behaviour sequences in fractal time have an optimal complexity range, which can be thought of as the homeostatic state on the spectrum where the complexity sequence should regularly fall. An increase or a loss in complexity, either becoming more stereotypical or conversely more random in their behaviour patterns, indicates that there has been an alteration in the functionality of the individual. Using fractal analysis, it is possible to examine the movement sequential complexity of animal behaviour and to determine whether individuals are experiencing deviations from their optimal range, suggesting a change in condition. For example, it has been used to assess welfare of domestic hens, stress in bottlenose dolphins in response to human disturbance, and parasitic infection in Japanese macaques and sheep. The research is furthering the field of behavioural ecology by simplifying and quantifying very complex relationships. When it comes to animal welfare and conservation, fractal analysis makes it possible to identify potential sources of stress on animal behaviour, stressors that may not always be discernible through classical behaviour research.

This approach is more objective than classical behaviour measurements, such as frequency-based observations that are limited by the counts of behaviours, but is able to delve into the underlying reason for the behaviour. Another important advantage of fractal analysis is the ability to monitor the health of wild and free-ranging animal populations in their natural habitats without invasive measurements.

== Applications include ==
Applications of fractal analysis include:

- Heart rate analysis
- Human gait, balance, and activity
- Human anatomy
- Diagnostic imaging
- Cancer research
- Fractal analysis of complex networks
- Classification of histopathology slides in medicine
- Fractal landscape or Coastline complexity
- Electrical engineering
- Enzyme/enzymology (Michaelis-Menten kinetics)
- Generation of new music
- Generation of various art forms
- Search and rescue
- Signal and image compression

- Urban growth
- Neuroscience
- Diagnostic imaging
- Pathology
- Geology
- Geography
- Archaeology
- Seismology
- Soil studies
- Computer and video game design, especially computer graphics for organic environments and as part of procedural generation
- Fractography and fracture mechanics
- Fractal antennas — Small size antennas using fractal shapes
- Small angle scattering theory of fractally rough systems
- Generation of patterns for camouflage, such as MARPAT
- Digital sundial

- Fractal calculus

== See also ==
- Multifractal
- Rescaled range
- Analysis on fractals
