= Correlation dimension =

Dimensionality measure in chaos theory

In chaos theory, the correlation dimension (denoted by ν) is a measure of the dimensionality of the space occupied by a set of random points, often referred to as a type of fractal dimension.

For example, if we have a set of random points on the real number line between 0 and 1, the correlation dimension will be ν = 1, while if they are distributed on say, a triangle embedded in three-dimensional space (or m-dimensional space), the correlation dimension will be ν = 2. This is what we would intuitively expect from a measure of dimension. The real utility of the correlation dimension is in determining the (possibly fractional) dimensions of fractal objects. There are other methods of measuring dimension (e.g. the Hausdorff dimension, the box-counting dimension, and the information dimension) but the correlation dimension has the advantage of being straightforwardly and quickly calculated, of being less noisy when only a small number of points is available, and is often in agreement with other calculations of dimension.

For any set of N points in an m-dimensional space

$$\vec x(i)=[x_1(i),x_2(i),\ldots,x_m(i)], \qquad i=1,2,\ldots N$$

then the correlation integral C(ε) is calculated by:

$$C(\varepsilon)=\lim_{N \rightarrow \infty} \frac{g}{N^2}$$

where g is the total number of pairs of points which have a distance between them that is less than distance ε (a graphical representation of such close pairs is the recurrence plot). As the number of points tends to infinity, and the distance between them tends to zero, the correlation integral, for small values of ε, will take the form:

$$C(\varepsilon) \sim \varepsilon^\nu$$

If the number of points is sufficiently large, and evenly distributed, a log-log graph of the correlation integral versus ε will yield an estimate of ν. This idea can be qualitatively understood by realizing that for higher-dimensional objects, there will be more ways for points to be close to each other, and so the number of pairs close to each other will rise more rapidly for higher dimensions.

Grassberger and Procaccia introduced the technique in 1983; the article gives the results of such estimates for a number of fractal objects, as well as comparing the values to other measures of fractal dimension. The technique can be used to distinguish between (deterministic) chaotic and truly random behavior, although it may not be good at detecting deterministic behavior if the deterministic generating mechanism is very complex.

As an example, in the "Sun in Time" article, the method was used to show that the number of sunspots on the sun, after accounting for the known cycles such as the daily and 11-year cycles, is very likely not random noise, but rather chaotic noise, with a low-dimensional fractal attractor.

== See also ==
- Takens's theorem
- Correlation integral
- Recurrence quantification analysis
- Approximate entropy
