= Dilation (metric space) =

In mathematics, a dilation is a function $f$ from a metric space $M$ into itself that satisfies the identity

$$d(f(x),f(y))=rd(x,y)$$

for all points $x, y \in M$, where $d(x, y)$ is the distance from $x$ to $y$ and $r$ is some positive real number.

In Euclidean space, such a dilation is a similarity of the space. Dilations change the size but not the shape of an object or figure.

Every dilation of a Euclidean space that is not a congruence has a unique fixed point that is called the center of dilation. Some congruences have fixed points and others do not.

== See also ==
- Homothety
- Dilation (operator theory)
