= Packing dimension =

Dimension of a subset of a metric space

In mathematics, the packing dimension is one of a number of concepts that can be used to define the dimension of a subset of a metric space. Packing dimension is in some sense dual to Hausdorff dimension, since packing dimension is constructed by "packing" small open balls inside the given subset, whereas Hausdorff dimension is constructed by covering the given subset by such small open balls. The packing dimension was introduced by C. Tricot Jr. in 1982.

== Definitions ==
Let (X, d) be a metric space with a subset S ⊆ X and let s ≥ 0 be a real number. The s-dimensional packing pre-measure of S is defined to be

$$P_0^s (S) = \limsup_{\delta \downarrow 0}\left\{ \left. \sum_{i \in I} \mathrm{diam} (B_i)^s \right| \begin{matrix} \{ B_i \}_{i \in I} \text{ is a countable collection} \\ \text{of pairwise disjoint closed balls with} \\ \text{diameters } \leq \delta \text{ and centres in } S \end{matrix} \right\}.$$

Unfortunately, this is just a pre-measure and not a true measure on subsets of X, as can be seen by considering dense, countable subsets. However, the pre-measure leads to a bona fide measure: the s-dimensional packing measure of S is defined to be

$$P^s (S) = \inf \left\{ \left. \sum_{j \in J} P_0^s (S_j) \right| S \subseteq \bigcup_{j \in J} S_j, J \text{ countable} \right\},$$

i.e., the packing measure of S is the infimum of the packing pre-measures of countable covers of S.

Having done this, the packing dimension dim_{P}(S) of S is defined analogously to the Hausdorff dimension:

$$\begin{align}
\dim_{\mathrm{P}} (S) &{}  = \sup \{ s \geq 0 | P^s (S) = + \infty \} \\
&{} = \inf \{ s \geq 0 | P^s (S) = 0 \}.
\end{align}$$

=== An example ===
The following example is the simplest situation where Hausdorff and packing dimensions may differ.

Fix a sequence $(a_n)$ such that $a_0=1$ and $0<a_{n+1}<a_n/2$. Define inductively a nested sequence $E_0 \supset E_1 \supset E_2 \supset \cdots$ of compact subsets of the real line as follows: Let $E_0=[0,1]$. For each connected component of $E_n$ (which will necessarily be an interval of length $a_n$), delete the middle interval of length $a_n - 2a_{n+1}$, obtaining two intervals of length $a_{n+1}$, which will be taken as connected components of $E_{n+1}$. Next, define $K = \bigcap_n E_n$. Then $K$ is topologically a Cantor set (i.e., a compact totally disconnected perfect space). For example, $K$ will be the usual middle-thirds Cantor set if $a_n=3^{-n}$.

It is possible to show that the Hausdorff and the packing dimensions of the set $K$ are given respectively by:

$$\begin{align}
\dim_{\mathrm{H}} (K) &{}  = \liminf_{n\to\infty} \frac{n \log 2}{- \log a_n} \, , \\
\dim_{\mathrm{P}} (K) &{}  = \limsup_{n\to\infty} \frac{n \log 2}{- \log a_n} \, .
\end{align}$$

It follows easily that given numbers $0 \leq d_1 \leq d_2 \leq 1$, one can choose a sequence $(a_n)$ as above such that the associated (topological) Cantor set $K$ has Hausdorff dimension $d_1$ and packing dimension $d_2$.

=== Generalizations ===
One can consider dimension functions more general than "diameter to the s": for any function h : [0, +∞) → [0, +∞], let the packing pre-measure of S with dimension function h be given by

$$P_0^h (S) = \lim_{\delta \downarrow 0} \sup \left\{ \left. \sum_{i \in I} h \big( \mathrm{diam} (B_i) \big) \right| \begin{matrix} \{ B_{i} \}_{i \in I} \text{ is a countable collection} \\ \text{of pairwise disjoint balls with} \\ \text{diameters } \leq \delta \text{ and centres in } S \end{matrix} \right\}$$

and define the packing measure of S with dimension function h by

$$P^h (S) = \inf \left\{ \left. \sum_{j \in J} P_0^h (S_j) \right| S \subseteq \bigcup_{j \in J} S_j, J \text{ countable} \right\}.$$

The function h is said to be an exact (packing) dimension function for S if P^{h}(S) is both finite and strictly positive.

== Properties ==
- If S is a subset of n-dimensional Euclidean space R^{n} with its usual metric, then the packing dimension of S is equal to the upper modified box dimension of S: $\dim_{\mathrm{P}} (S) = \overline{\dim}_\mathrm{MB} (S).$ This result is interesting because it shows how a dimension derived from a measure (packing dimension) agrees with one derived without using a measure (the modified box dimension).

Note, however, that the packing dimension is not equal to the box dimension. For example, the set of rationals Q has box dimension one and packing dimension zero.

== See also ==
- Hausdorff dimension
- Minkowski–Bouligand dimension
