= Lebesgue covering dimension =

Topologically invariant definition of the dimension of a space

In mathematics, the Lebesgue covering dimension or topological dimension of a topological space is one of several different ways of defining the dimension of the space in a topologically invariant way.

== Informal discussion ==
For ordinary Euclidean spaces, the Lebesgue covering dimension is just the ordinary Euclidean dimension: zero for points, one for lines, two for planes, and so on. However, not all topological spaces have this kind of "obvious" dimension, and so a precise definition is needed in such cases. The definition proceeds by examining what happens when the space is covered by open sets.

In general, a topological space X can be covered by open sets, in that one can find a collection of open sets such that X lies inside of their union. The covering dimension is the smallest number n such that for every cover, there is a refinement in which every point in X lies in the intersection of no more than n + 1 covering sets. This is the gist of the formal definition below. The goal of the definition is to provide a number (an integer) that describes the space, and does not change as the space is continuously deformed; that is, a number that is invariant under homeomorphisms.

The general idea is illustrated in the diagrams below, which show a cover and refinements of a circle and a square.

Refinement of the cover of a circle

Refinement of the cover of a square

The first image shows a refinement (on the bottom) of a colored cover (on the top) of a black circular line. Note how in the refinement, no point on the circle is contained in more than two sets, and also how the sets link to one another to form a "chain".
The top half of the second image shows a cover (colored) of a planar shape (dark), where all of the shape's points are contained in anywhere from one to all four of the cover's sets. The bottom illustrates that any attempt to refine said cover such that no point would be contained in more than two sets—ultimately fails at the intersection of set borders. Thus, a planar shape is not "webby": it cannot be covered with "chains", per se. Instead, it proves to be thicker in some sense. More rigorously put, its topological dimension must be greater than 1.

== Formal definition ==
Henri Lebesgue used closed "bricks" to study covering dimension in 1921.

The first formal definition of covering dimension was given by Eduard Čech, based on an earlier result of Henri Lebesgue.

A modern definition is as follows. An open cover of a topological space X is a family $\mathfrak A$ of nonempty open sets U_{α} such that not two of them are equal and such that their union is the whole space, $\cup_\alpha$ U_{α} = X. The order or ply of an open cover $\mathfrak A$ = {U_{α}} is the smallest number m (if it exists) for which each point of the space belongs to at most m different open sets in the cover : in other words U_{α_{1}} ∩ ⋅⋅⋅ ∩ U_{α_{m+1}} = $\emptyset$ for every m+1 different open elements U_{α_{I}}'s of the cover $\mathfrak A$ of X. A refinement of an open cover $\mathfrak A$ = {U_{α}} is another open cover $\mathfrak B$ = {V_{β}}, such that each V_{β} is contained in some U_{α}. A cover is called finite, if it consists of finitely many sets. The covering dimension of a topological space X is defined to be the minimum value of n such that every finite open cover $\mathfrak A$ of X has an open refinement $\mathfrak B$ with order n + 1. The refinement $\mathfrak B$ can always be chosen to be finite. Thus, if n is finite, V_{β_{1}} ∩ ⋅⋅⋅ ∩ V_{β_{n+2}} = $\emptyset$ for β_{1}, ..., β_{n+2} distinct. If no such minimal n exists, the space is said to have infinite covering dimension.

As a special case, a non-empty topological space is zero-dimensional with respect to the covering dimension if every open cover of the space has a refinement consisting of disjoint open sets, meaning any point in the space is contained in exactly one open set of this refinement.

== Examples ==
The empty set has covering dimension −1: for any open cover of the empty set, each point of the empty set is not contained in any element of the cover, so the order of any open cover is 0.

Any given open cover of the unit circle will have a refinement consisting of a collection of open arcs. The circle has dimension one, by this definition, because any such cover can be further refined to the stage where a given point x of the circle is contained in at most two open arcs. That is, whatever collection of arcs we begin with, some can be discarded or shrunk, such that the remainder still covers the circle but with simple overlaps.

Similarly, any open cover of the unit disk in the two-dimensional plane can be refined so that any point of the disk is contained in no more than three open sets, while two are in general not sufficient. The covering dimension of the disk is thus two.

More generally, the n-dimensional Euclidean space $\mathbb{E}^n$ has covering dimension n.

== Properties ==
- Homeomorphic spaces have the same covering dimension. That is, the covering dimension is a topological invariant.
- The covering dimension of a normal space X is $\le n$ if and only if for any closed subset A of X, if $f:A\rightarrow S^n$ is continuous, then there is an extension of $f$ to $g:X\rightarrow S^n$. Here, $S^n$ is the n-dimensional sphere.
- Ostrand's theorem on covering dimension. If X is a normal topological space and $\mathfrak A$ = {U_{α}} is a locally finite cover of X of order ≤ n + 1, then, for each 1 ≤ i ≤ n + 1, there exists a family of pairwise disjoint open sets $\mathfrak B$_{i} = {V_{i,α}} shrinking $\mathfrak A$, i.e. V_{i,α} ⊆ U_{α}, and together covering X.

== Relationships to other notions of dimension ==
- For a paracompact space X, the covering dimension can be equivalently defined as the minimum value of n, such that every open cover $\mathfrak A$ of X (of any size) has an open refinement $\mathfrak B$ with order n + 1. In particular, this holds for all metric spaces.
- Lebesgue covering theorem. The Lebesgue covering dimension coincides with the affine dimension of a finite simplicial complex.
- The covering dimension of a normal space is less than or equal to the large inductive dimension.
- The covering dimension of a paracompact Hausdorff space $X$ is greater or equal to its cohomological dimension (in the sense of sheaves), that is, one has $H^i(X,A) = 0$ for every sheaf $A$ of abelian groups on $X$ and every $i$ larger than the covering dimension of $X$.
- In a metric space, one can strengthen the notion of the multiplicity of a cover: a cover has r-multiplicity n + 1 if every r-ball intersects with at most n + 1 sets in the cover. This idea leads to the definitions of the asymptotic dimension and Assouad–Nagata dimension of a space: a space with asymptotic dimension n is n-dimensional "at large scales", and a space with Assouad–Nagata dimension n is n-dimensional "at every scale".

== See also ==
- Carathéodory's extension theorem
- Geometric set cover problem
- Metacompact space
- Point-finite collection
