= Boris Chirikov =

20th-century Russian physicist

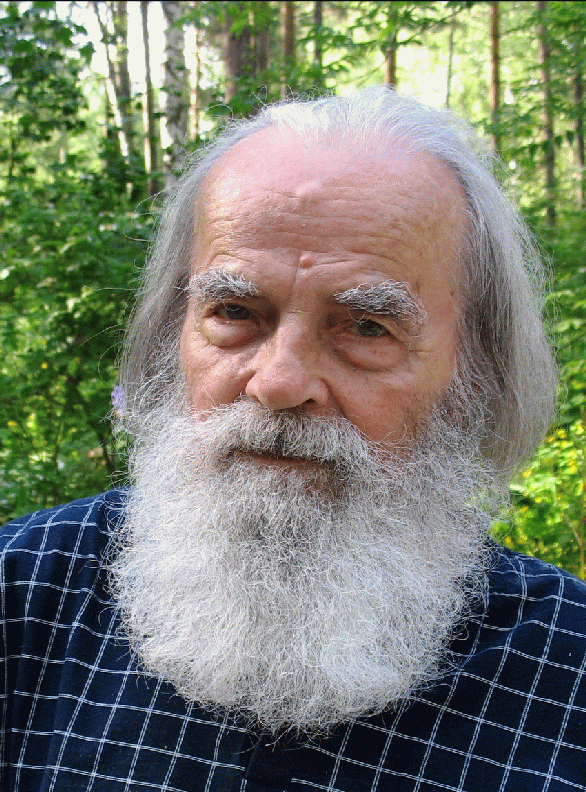
- Boris Chirikov, June, 2007 (Photo by Galya Chirikova)
- Born: Boris Valerianovich Chirikov; 6 June 1928; Oryol, USSR
- Died: 12 February 2008 (aged 79)
- Education: Moscow Institute of Physics and Technology (1952)
- Known for: Chaos theory Standard map Chirikov criterion
- Spouse: Olga Bashina
- Children: Galya Chirikova
- Scientific career
- Fields: Physics
- Workplaces: Kurchatov Institute; Budker Institute of Nuclear Physics

Boris Valerianovich Chirikov (Russian: Борис Валерианович Чириков; 6 June 1928 – 12 February 2008) was a Soviet and Russian physicist. He was the founder of the physical theory of Hamiltonian chaos and made pioneering contributions to the theory of quantum chaos. In 1959, he invented the Chirikov criterion which gives an analytical estimate for the overlap of resonances and provides the conditions for transition from integrability to global chaos in Hamiltonian dynamical systems.

== Life and physics ==
Boris Chirikov was born in the city Oryol, Russia, USSR. Graduated from the Moscow Institute of Physics and Technology in 1952, he worked with Budker at the Kurchatov Institute and moved with him to Siberia in September 1959 to work at the Institute founded by Budker in Akademgorodok, Novosibirsk (now Budker Institute of Nuclear Physics). He became a corresponding member of the Russian Academy of Sciences in 1983, and a full member in 1992. He worked at the Institute in Akademgorodok till his last days. He left after him wife Olga Bashina and daughter Galya Chirikova.

The name of Boris Chirikov is associated with an impressive list of fundamental results in the field of dynamical chaos and foundations of statistical mechanics. As early as 1959, in a seminal article, Chirikov proposed a criterion for the emergence of classical chaos in Hamiltonian systems, now known as the Chirikov criterion (Atom. Energ. 6: 630 (1959)). In the same paper, he applied such criterion to explain some puzzling experimental results on plasma confinement in open mirror traps, that had just been obtained at the Kurchatov Institute. This was the very first physical theory of chaos, which succeeded in explaining a concrete experiment, and which was developed long before computers made the icons of chaos familiar to everyone.

Other results obtained by his group include: analysis of the transition to strong chaos in the Fermi-Pasta-Ulam problem; the derivation of the chaos border for the Fermi acceleration model; the numerical computation of the Kolmogorov-Sinai entropy in area-preserving maps; the investigations of weak instabilities in many-dimensional Hamiltonian systems (Arnold diffusion and modulational diffusion); the demonstration that the homogeneous models of classical Yang-Mills field have positive Kolmogorov-Sinai entropy, and therefore are generally not integrable; the discovery of the power law decay of Poincaré recurrences in Hamiltonian systems with divided phase space; the demonstration that the dynamics of the Halley comet is chaotic, and is described by a simple map.

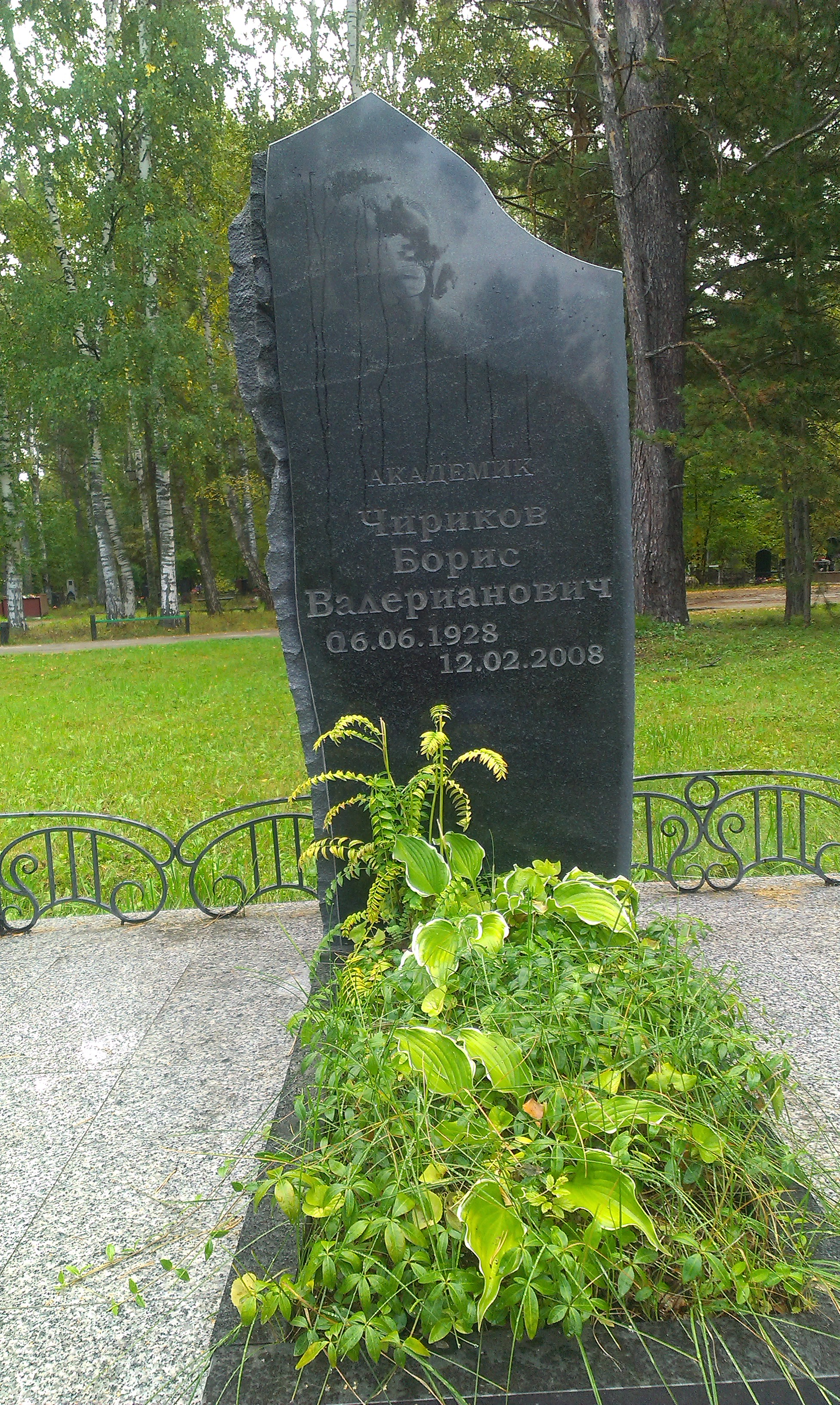
Grave of Boris Chirikov at the Yuzhnoye Cemetery.

He essentially invented the Chirikov standard map, described its chaotic properties, established its ubiquity, and found a variety of applications. The quantum version of this map provides canonical kicked rotator model and demonstrates the phenomenon of dynamical localization of quantum chaos, which has been observed, for example, in experiments with hydrogen and Rydberg atoms in a microwave field and cold atoms and Bose–Einstein condensates in kicked optical lattices.

Boris Chirikov was one of the first teachers in Novosibirsk State University.

The physical theory of deterministic chaos developed by Boris Chirikov has found applications in solar system dynamics, particle dynamics in accelerators and plasma magnetic traps, and numerous other systems.

The scientist died on February 12, 2008, and was buried at the Yuzhnoye Cemetery in Novosibirsk.
