= Chirikov criterion =

The Chirikov criterion or Chirikov resonance-overlap criterion was established by the Russian physicist Boris Chirikov. Back in 1959, he published a seminal article, where he introduced the very first physical criterion for the onset of chaotic motion in deterministic Hamiltonian systems. He then applied such a criterion to explain puzzling experimental results on plasma confinement in magnetic bottles obtained by Rodionov at the Kurchatov Institute.

== Description ==
According to this criterion a deterministic trajectory will begin to move between two nonlinear resonances in a chaotic and unpredictable manner, in the parameter range

$$K \approx S^2 = (\Delta \omega_r/\Delta_d)^2 > 1 .$$

Here $K$ is the perturbation parameter, while $S = \Delta \omega_r/\Delta_d$ is the resonance-overlap parameter, given by the ratio of the unperturbed resonance width in frequency $\Delta \omega_r$ (often computed in the pendulum approximation and proportional to the square-root of perturbation), and the frequency difference $\Delta_d$ between two unperturbed resonances. Since its introduction, the Chirikov criterion has become an important analytical tool for the determination of the chaos border.

== See also ==
- Chirikov criterion at Scholarpedia
- Chirikov standard map and standard map
- Boris Chirikov and Boris Chirikov at Scholarpedia
