= Yuzhnoye Cemetery (Novosibirsk) =

Cemetery in Novosibirsk, Novosibirsk Oblast, Russia

Yuzhnoye cemetery
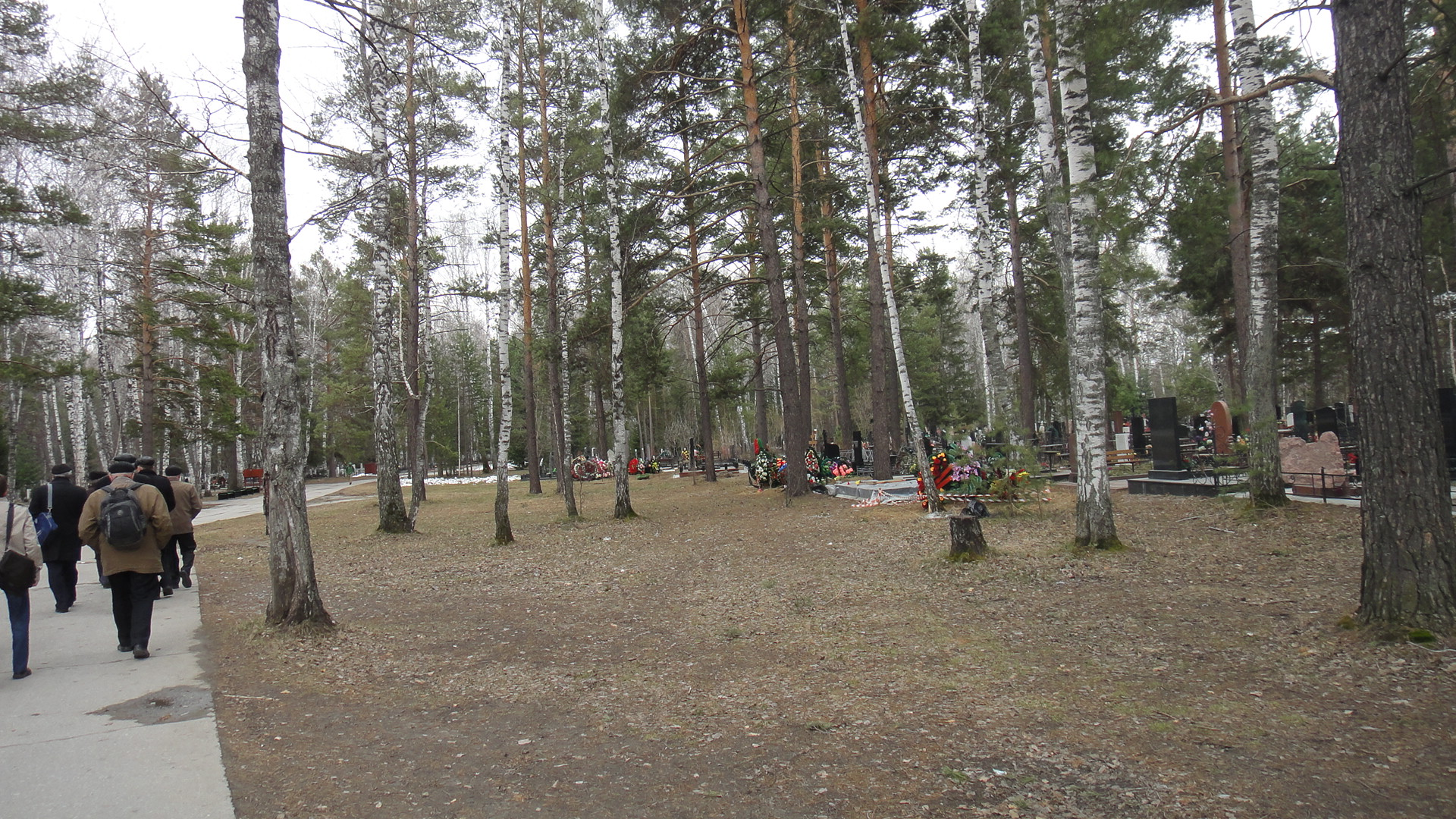
- Interactive map of Yuzhnoye cemetery

Details
- Location: Novosibirsk
- Country: Russia
- Coordinates: 54°52′12″N 83°7′19″E

Yuzhnoye (Cherbuzinskoye) Cemetery (Russian: Южное кладбище) is a cemetery in the Sovetsky City District of Novosibirsk, Russia.

== Notable people buried at the Yuzhnoye Cemetery ==
- Dmitry Belyayev, a Soviet geneticist, was director of the Institute of Cytology and Genetics from 1959 to 1985. (See also Domesticated Red Fox)
- Gersh Budker, a Soviet physicist who specialised in nuclear physics and accelerator physics was the founder and first Director of the Institute of Nuclear Physics.
- Andrey Ershov, a Soviet computer scientist and pioneer in systems programming and programming language research
- Valentin Koptyug, a Russian chemist
- Samson Kutateladze, a Soviet heat physicist and hydrodynamicist
- Mikhail Lavrentyev, a Soviet mathematician and hydrodynamist, was one of the founders of the Siberian Branch of the Russian Academy of Sciences (SBRAS).
- Anatoly Maltsev, a Soviet mathematician (see also Malcev algebra)
- Alexey Okladnikov, a Soviet archaeologist, historian, and ethnographer
- Yuri Rumer, a Soviet theoretical physicist who worked in the fields of quantum mechanics and quantum optics

== Gallery ==
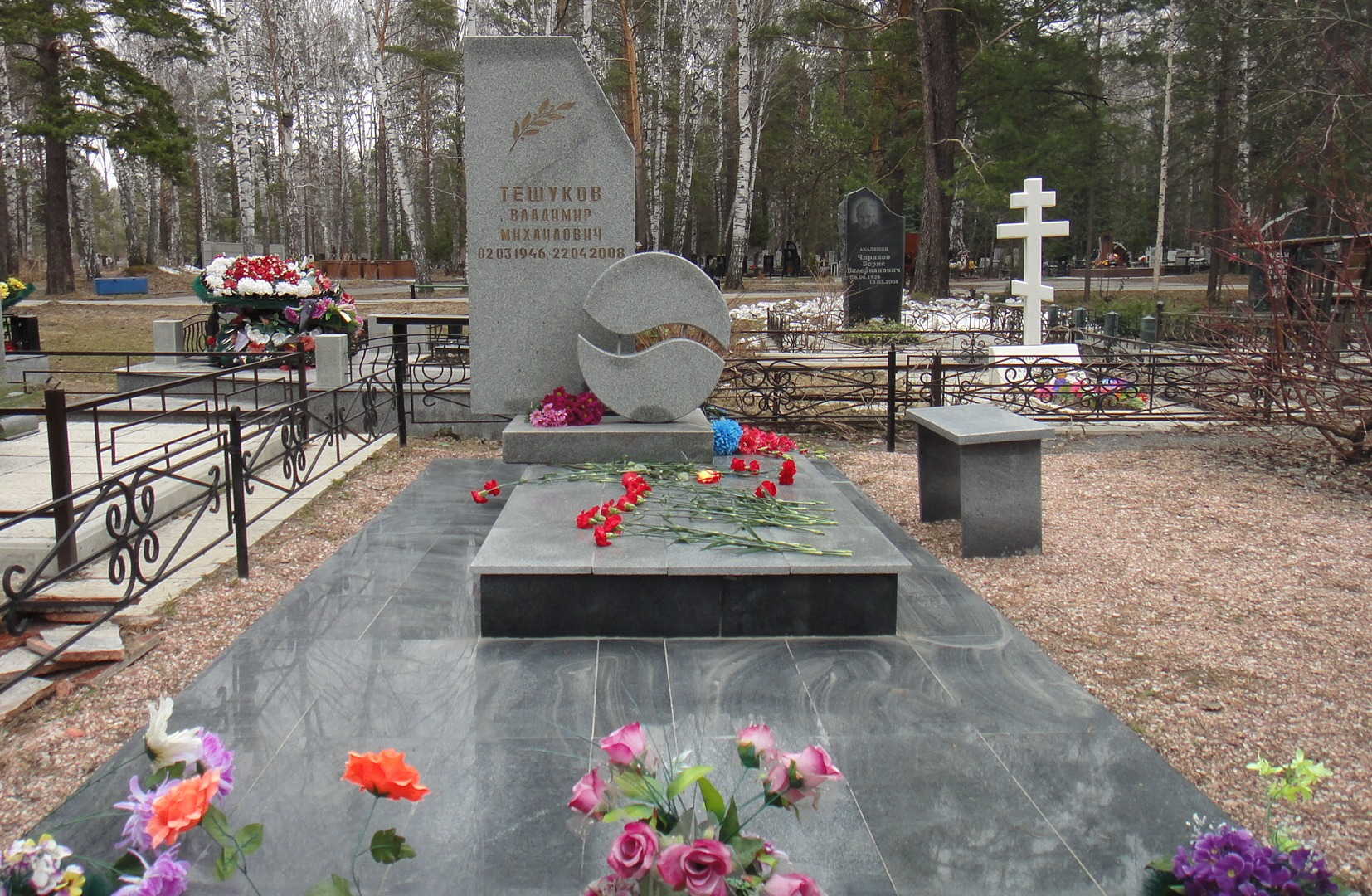
Teshukov's grave

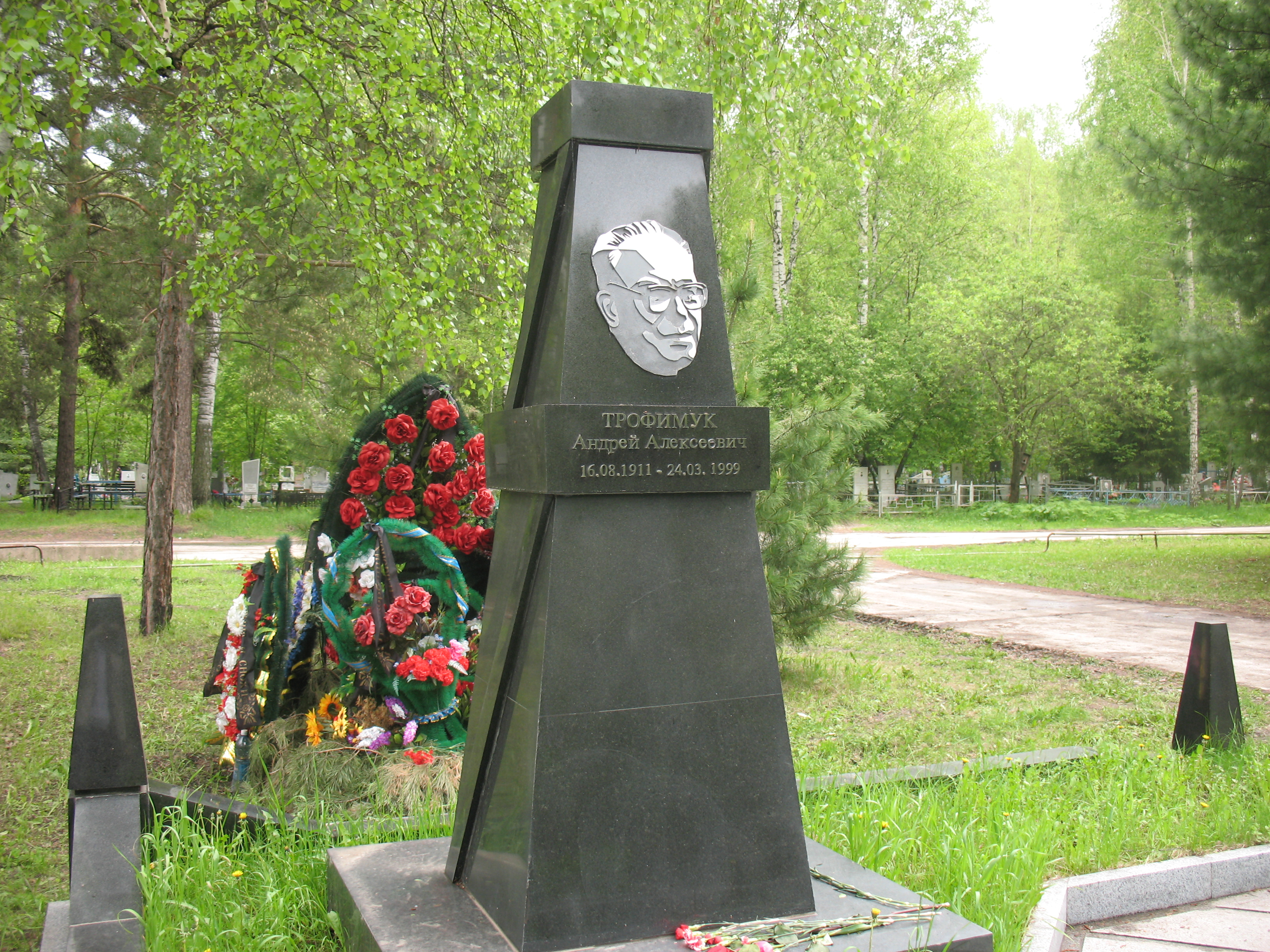
Trofimuk's grave

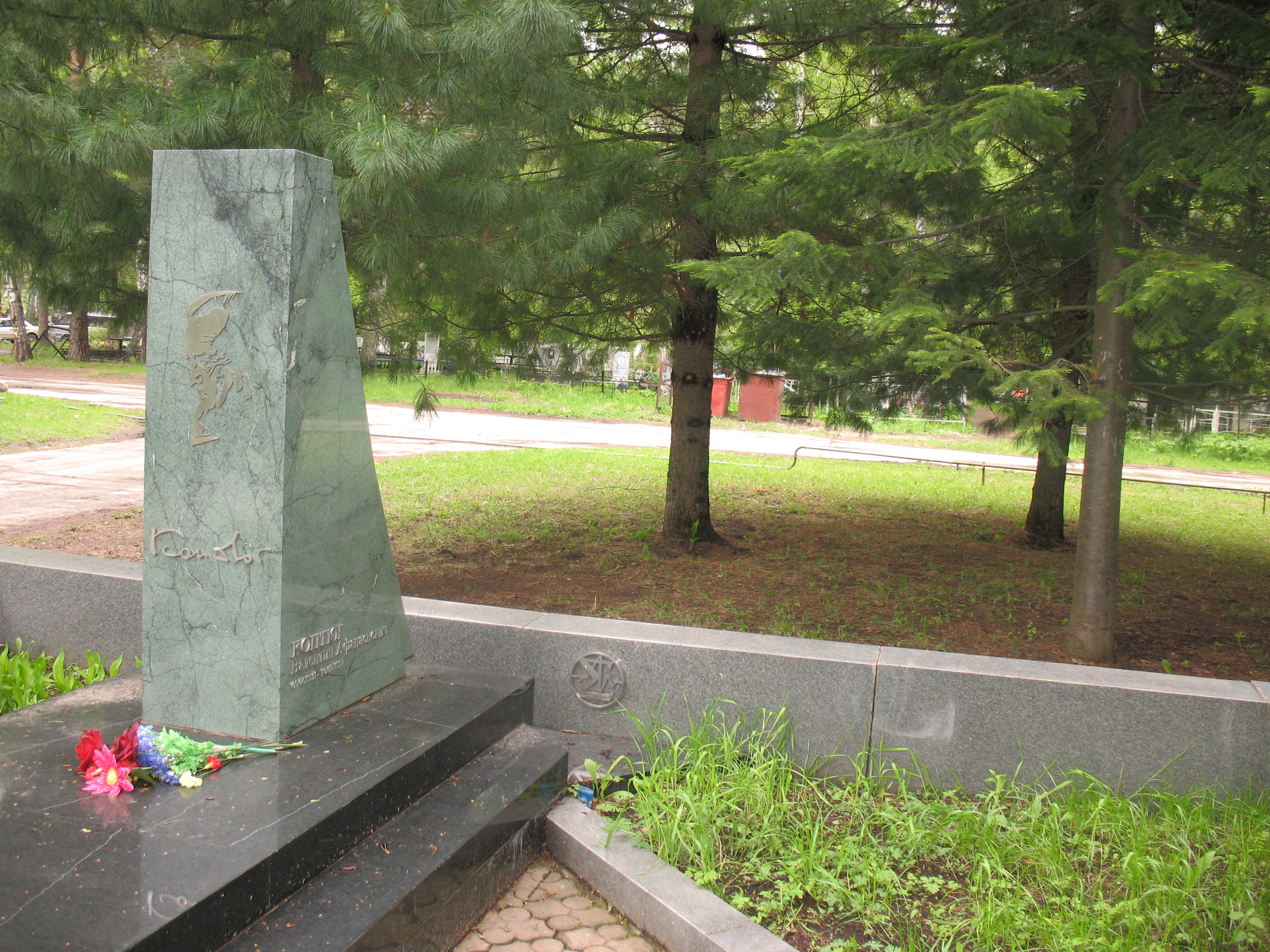
Koptug's grave

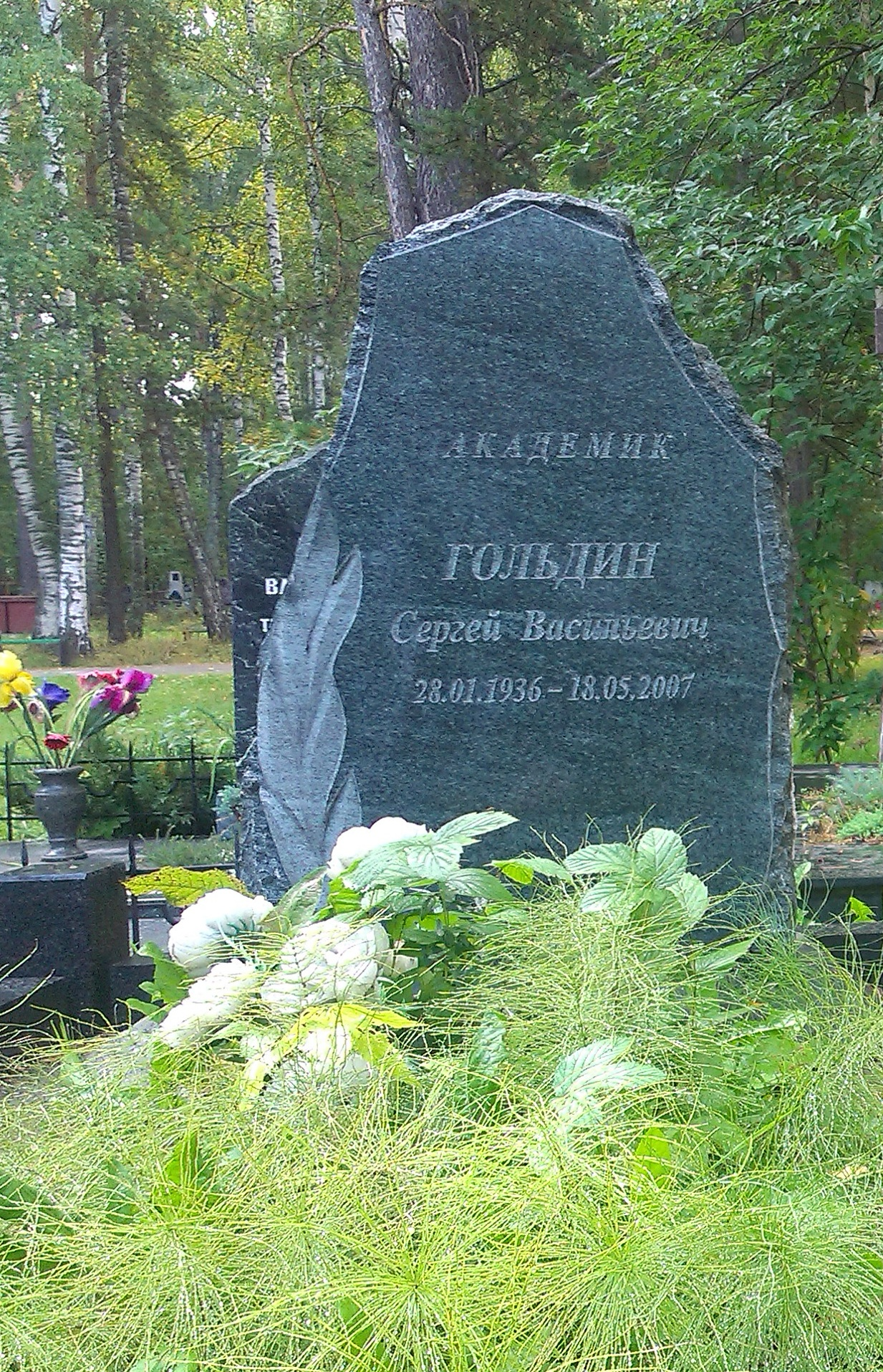
Goldin's grave

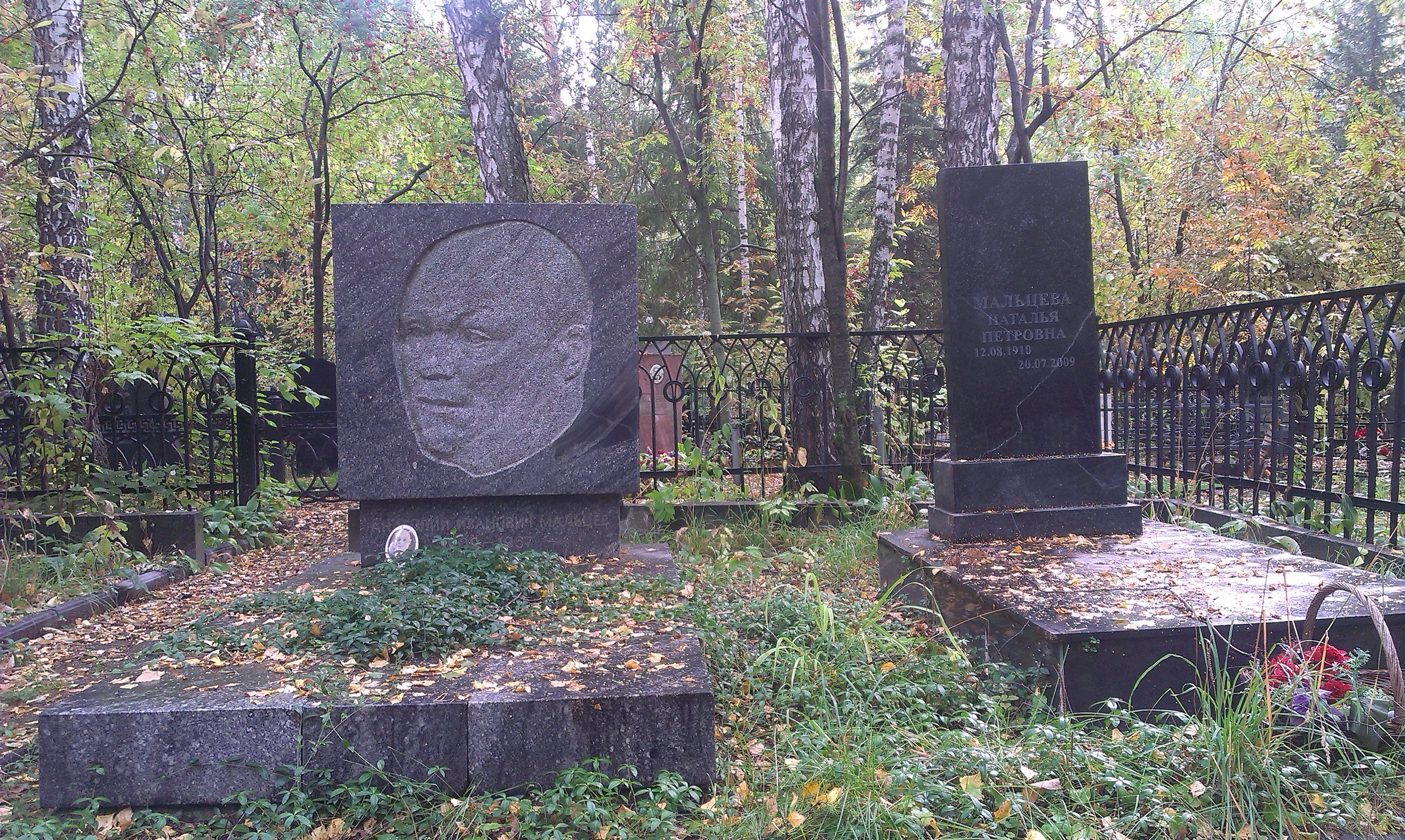
Maltsev's grave
