= Standard map =

Area-preserving chaotic map from a square with side 2π onto itself

The phase-space of the standard map with the variation of the parameter $K$ from 0 to 5.19 ($p_n$ in y axes, $\theta_n$ in x axes). Notice the appearance of a "dotted" zone, a signature of chaotic behavior.

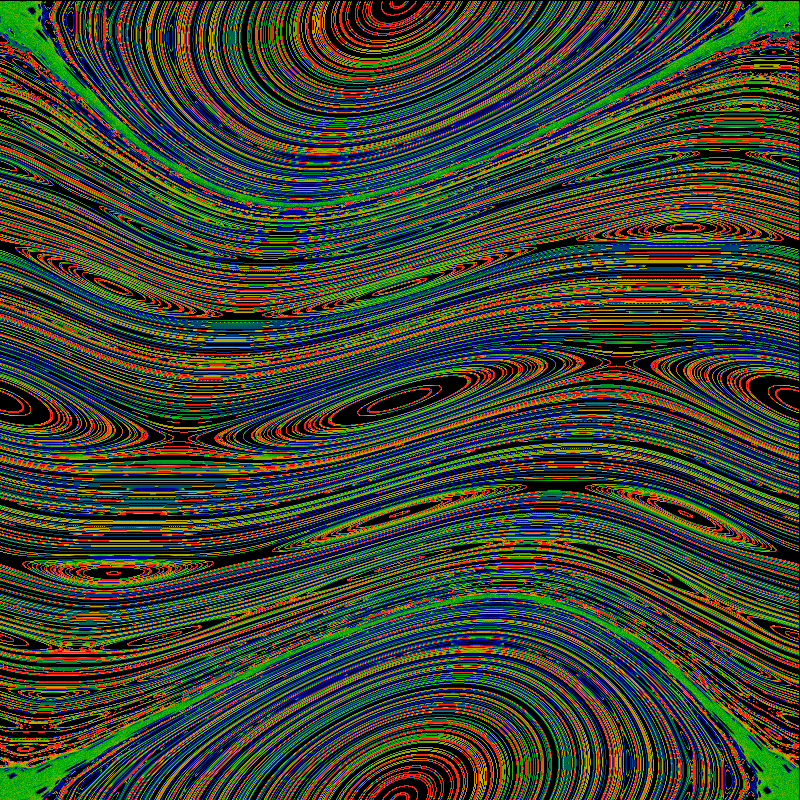
Orbits of the standard map for K = 0.6.

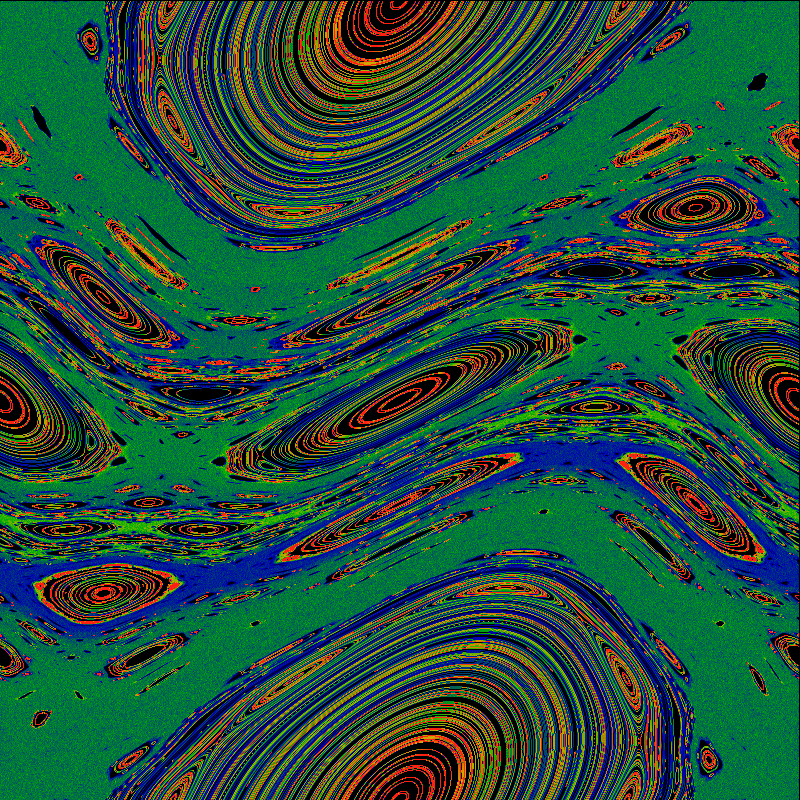
Orbits of the standard map for K = 0.971635.

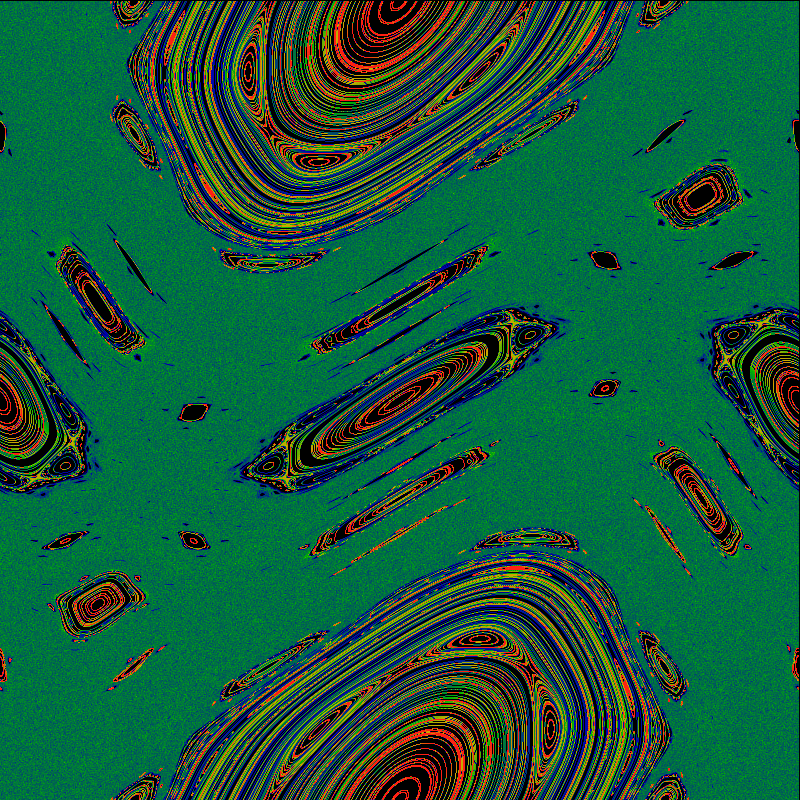
Orbits of the standard map for K = 1.2.

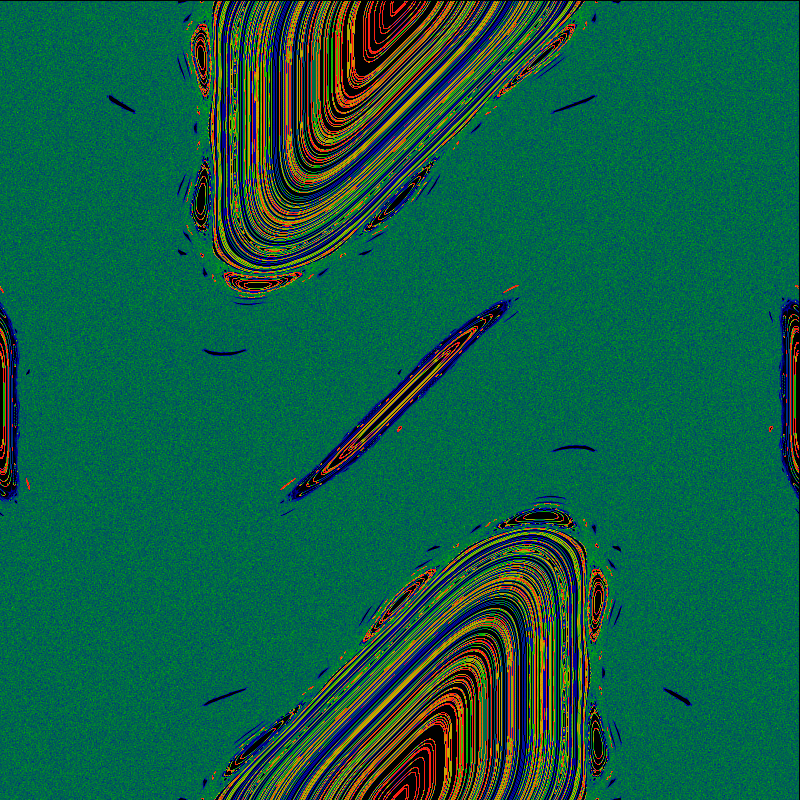
Orbits of the standard map for K = 2.0. The large green region is the main chaotic region of the map.

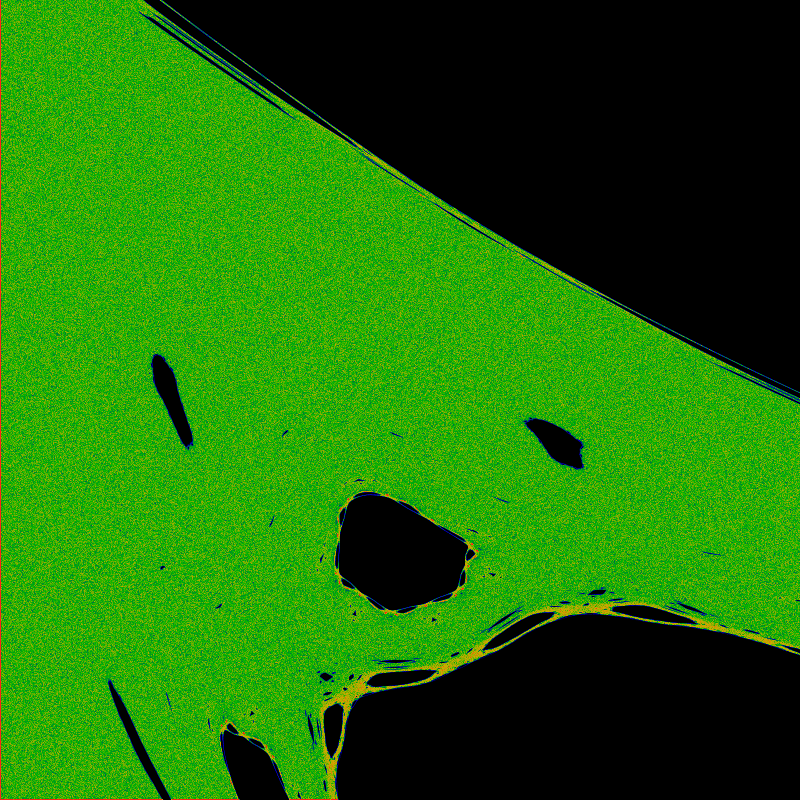
A single orbit of the standard map for K=2.0. Magnified close-up centered at $\theta=0.282$, p = 0.666, of total width/height 0.02. Note the extremely uniform distribution of the orbit.

The standard map (also known as the Chirikov–Taylor map or as the Chirikov standard map) is an area-preserving chaotic map from a square with side $2\pi$ onto itself. It is constructed by a Poincaré's surface of section of the kicked rotator, and is defined by:

$$p_{n+1} = p_n + K \sin(\theta_n)$$
$$\theta_{n+1} = \theta_n + p_{n+1}$$

where $p_n$ and $\theta_n$ are taken modulo $2\pi$.

The properties of chaos of the standard map were established by Boris Chirikov in 1969.

== Physical model ==
This map describes the Poincaré's surface of section of the motion of a simple mechanical system known as the kicked rotator. The kicked rotator consists of a stick that is free of the gravitational force, which can rotate frictionlessly in a plane around an axis located in one of its tips, and which is periodically kicked on the other tip.

The standard map is a surface of section applied by a stroboscopic projection on the variables of the kicked rotator. The variables $\theta_n$ and $p_n$ respectively determine the angular position of the stick and its angular momentum after the n-th kick. The constant K measures the intensity of the kicks on the kicked rotator.

The kicked rotator approximates systems studied in the fields of mechanics of particles, accelerator physics, plasma physics, and solid state physics. For example, circular particle accelerators accelerate particles by applying periodic kicks, as they circulate in the beam tube. Thus, the structure of the beam can be approximated by the kicked rotor. However, this map is interesting from a fundamental point of view in physics and mathematics because it is a very simple model of a conservative system that displays Hamiltonian chaos. It is therefore useful to study the development of chaos in this kind of system.

== Main properties ==
For $K=0$ the map is linear and only periodic and quasiperiodic orbits are possible. When plotted in phase space (the θ–p plane), periodic orbits appear as closed curves, and quasiperiodic orbits as necklaces of closed curves whose centers lie in another larger closed curve. Which type of orbit is observed depends on the map's initial conditions.

Nonlinearity of the map increases with K, and with it the possibility to observe chaotic dynamics for appropriate initial conditions. This is illustrated in the figure, which displays a collection of different orbits allowed to the standard map for various values of $K > 0$. All the orbits shown are periodic or quasiperiodic, with the exception of the green one that is chaotic and develops in a large region of phase space as an apparently random set of points. Particularly remarkable is the extreme uniformity of the distribution in the chaotic region, although this can be deceptive: even within the chaotic regions, there are an infinite number of diminishingly small islands that are never visited during iteration, as shown in the close-up.

== Circle map ==
The standard map is related to the circle map, which has a single, similar iterated equation:

$$\theta_{n+1} = \theta_n + \Omega - K \sin(\theta_n)$$

as compared to

$$\theta_{n+1} = \theta_n + p_n + K \sin(\theta_n)$$
$$p_{n+1} = \theta_{n+1} - \theta_{n}$$

for the standard map, the equations reordered to emphasize similarity. In essence, the circle map forces the momentum to a constant.

== See also ==
- Ushiki's theorem
