= Fractal compression =

Compression method for digital images

2 triangles, example to show how fractal compression works

Fractal compression is a lossy compression method for digital images, based on fractals. The method is best suited for textures and natural images, relying on the fact that parts of an image often resemble other parts of the same image. Fractal algorithms convert these parts into mathematical data called "fractal codes" which are used to recreate the encoded image.

== Iterated function systems ==
Fractal image representation may be described mathematically as an iterated function system (IFS).

=== For binary images ===
We begin with the representation of a binary image, where the image may be thought of as a subset of $\mathbb{R}^2$. An IFS is a set of contraction mappings ƒ_{1},...,ƒ_{N},

$$f_i:\mathbb{R}^2\to \mathbb{R}^2.$$

According to these mapping functions, the IFS describes a two-dimensional set S as the fixed point of the Hutchinson operator

$$H(A)=\bigcup_{i=1}^N f_i(A), \quad A \subset \mathbb{R}^2.$$

That is, H is an operator mapping sets to sets, and S is the unique set satisfying H(S) = S. The idea is to construct the IFS such that this set S is the input binary image. The set S can be recovered from the IFS by fixed point iteration: for any nonempty compact initial set A_{0}, the iteration A_{k+1} = H(A_{k}) converges to S.

The set S is self-similar because H(S) = S implies that S is a union of mapped copies of itself:

$$S=f_1(S)\cup f_2(S) \cup\cdots\cup f_N(S)$$

So we see the IFS is a fractal representation of S.

=== Extension to grayscale ===
IFS representation can be extended to a grayscale image by considering the image's graph as a subset of $\mathbb{R}^3$. For a grayscale image u(x,y), consider the set S = {(x,y,u(x,y))}. Then similar to the binary case, S is described by an IFS using a set of contraction mappings ƒ_{1},...,ƒ_{N}, but in $\mathbb{R}^3$,

$$f_i:\mathbb{R}^3\to \mathbb{R}^3.$$

=== Encoding ===
A challenging problem of ongoing research in fractal image representation is how to choose the ƒ_{1},...,ƒ_{N} such that its fixed point approximates the input image, and how to do this efficiently.

A simple approach for doing so is the following partitioned iterated function system (PIFS):

1. Partition the image domain into range blocks R_{i} of size s×s.
2. For each R_{i}, search the image to find a block D_{i} of size 2s×2s that is very similar to R_{i}.
3. Select the mapping functions such that H(D_{i}) = R_{i} for each i.

In the second step, it is important to find a similar block so that the IFS accurately represents the input image, so a sufficient number of candidate blocks for D_{i} need to be considered. On the other hand, a large search considering many blocks is computationally costly. This bottleneck of searching for similar blocks is why PIFS fractal encoding is much slower than, for example, DCT and wavelet based image representation.

The initial square partitioning and brute-force search algorithm presented by Jacquin provides a starting point for further research and extensions in many possible directions—different ways of partitioning the image into range blocks of various sizes and shapes; fast techniques for quickly finding a close-enough matching domain block for each range block rather than brute-force searching, such as fast motion estimation algorithms; different ways of encoding the mapping from the domain block to the range block; etc.

Other researchers attempt to find algorithms to automatically encode an arbitrary image as RIFS (recurrent iterated function systems) or global IFS, rather than PIFS; and algorithms for fractal video compression including motion compensation and three dimensional iterated function systems.

Fractal image compression has many similarities to vector quantization image compression.

== Features ==
With fractal compression, encoding is extremely computationally expensive because of the search used to find the self-similarities. Decoding, however, is quite fast. While this asymmetry has so far made it impractical for real time applications, when video is archived for distribution from disk storage or file downloads fractal compression becomes more competitive.

At common compression ratios, up to about 50:1, fractal compression provides similar results to DCT-based algorithms such as JPEG. At high compression ratios fractal compression may offer superior quality. For satellite imagery, ratios of over 170:1 have been achieved with acceptable results. Fractal video compression ratios of 25:1–244:1 have been achieved in reasonable compression times (2.4 to 66 sec/frame).

Compression efficiency increases with higher image complexity and color depth, compared to simple grayscale images.

=== Resolution independence and fractal scaling ===
An inherent feature of fractal compression is that images become resolution independent after being converted to fractal code. This is because the iterated function systems in the compressed file scale indefinitely. This indefinite scaling property of a fractal is known as "fractal scaling".

=== Fractal interpolation ===
The resolution independence of a fractal-encoded image can be used to increase the display resolution of an image. This process is also known as "fractal interpolation". In fractal interpolation, an image is encoded into fractal codes via fractal compression, and subsequently decompressed at a higher resolution. The result is an up-sampled image in which iterated function systems have been used as the interpolant. Fractal interpolation maintains geometric detail very well compared to traditional interpolation methods like bilinear interpolation and bicubic interpolation. Since the interpolation cannot reverse Shannon entropy however, it ends up sharpening the image by adding random instead of meaningful detail. One cannot, for example, enlarge an image of a crowd where each person's face is one or two pixels and hope to identify them.

== History ==
Michael Barnsley led the development of fractal compression from 1985 at the Georgia Institute of Technology (where both Barnsley and Sloan were professors in the mathematics department). The work was sponsored by DARPA and the Georgia Tech Research Corporation. The project resulted in several patents from 1987. Barnsley's graduate student Arnaud Jacquin implemented the first automatic algorithm in software in 1992. All methods are based on the fractal transform using iterated function systems. Michael Barnsley and Alan Sloan formed Iterated Systems Inc. in 1987 which was granted over 20 additional patents related to fractal compression.

A major breakthrough for Iterated Systems Inc. was the automatic fractal transform process which eliminated the need for human intervention during compression as was the case in early experimentation with fractal compression technology. In 1992, Iterated Systems Inc. received a US$2.1 million government grant to develop a prototype digital image storage and decompression chip using fractal transform image compression technology.

Fractal image compression has been used in a number of commercial applications: onOne Software, developed under license from Iterated Systems Inc., Genuine Fractals 5 which is a Photoshop plugin capable of saving files in compressed FIF (Fractal Image Format). To date the most successful use of still fractal image compression is by Microsoft in its Encarta multimedia encyclopedia, also under license.

Iterated Systems Inc. supplied a shareware encoder (Fractal Imager), a stand-alone decoder, a Netscape plug-in decoder and a development package for use under Windows. The redistribution of the "decompressor DLL" provided by the ColorBox III SDK was governed by restrictive per-disk or year-by-year licensing regimes for proprietary software vendors and by a discretionary scheme that entailed the promotion of the Iterated Systems products for certain classes of other users.

ClearVideo – also known as RealVideo (Fractal) – and SoftVideo were early fractal video compression products. ClearFusion was Iterated's freely distributed streaming video plugin for web browsers. In 1994 SoftVideo was licensed to Spectrum Holobyte for use in its CD-ROM games including Falcon Gold and Star Trek: The Next Generation A Final Unity.

In 1996, Iterated Systems Inc. announced an alliance with the Mitsubishi Corporation to market ClearVideo to their Japanese customers. The original ClearVideo 1.2 decoder driver is still supported by Microsoft in Windows Media Player although the encoder is no longer supported.

Two firms, Total Multimedia Inc. and Dimension, both claim to own or have the exclusive licence to Iterated's video technology, but neither has yet released a working product. The technology basis appears to be Dimension's U.S. patents 8639053 and 8351509, which have been considerably analyzed. In summary, it is a simple quadtree block-copying system with neither the bandwidth efficiency nor PSNR quality of traditional DCT-based codecs. In January 2016, TMMI announced that it was abandoning fractal-based technology altogether.

Research papers between 1997 and 2007 discussed possible solutions to improve fractal algorithms and encoding hardware.

== Implementations ==
A library called Fiasco was created by Ullrich Hafner. In 2001, Fiasco was covered in the Linux Journal. According to the 2000-04 Fiasco manual, Fiasco can be used for video compression. The Netpbm library includes the Fiasco library.

Femtosoft developed an implementation of fractal image compression in Object Pascal and Java.

== See also ==
- Iterated function system
- Image compression
- Wavelet
