= Truncated power function =

In mathematics, the truncated power function with exponent $n$ is defined as

$$x_+^n =
\begin{cases}
x^n &:\ x > 0 \\
0 &:\ x \le 0.
\end{cases}$$

In particular,

$$x_+ =
\begin{cases}
x &:\ x > 0 \\
0 &:\ x \le 0.
\end{cases}$$

and interpret the exponent as conventional power.

== Relations ==
- Truncated power functions can be used for construction of B-splines.
- $x \mapsto x_+^0$ is the Heaviside function.
- $\chi_{[a,b)}(x) = (b-x)_+^0 - (a-x)_+^0$ where $\chi$ is the indicator function.
- Truncated power functions are refinable.

== See also ==
- Macaulay brackets
