= Steven Bender =

American entrepreneur (1950–2010)

Steven Bender, CEO, iMagic Software

Steven Lee Bender (September 7, 1950 – March 5, 2010) was an American entrepreneur and founder of both Altamira Group (Genuine Fractals) and iMagic Software (typing pattern recognition). Bender made contributions to digital imaging and Photoshop, and to authentication for distributed systems by supporting turning passwords into a biometric akin to fingerprints. Information technology analyst Rob Enderle of the Enderle Group commented in January 2007 that this new technology was "a compelling solution in a world where identity theft and illegal access are the greatest growing threats to a business or family".

Steve Bender's, and co-founder Howard Postley's, patented and patent-pending system is based on muscle memory, that people have reliable patterns hidden inside the simple act of typing a password. By using these patterns, it is possible to distinguish the real users from impostors. This system extends the science often called Keystroke Dynamics.

In the 1990s, Bender's team developed Genuine Fractals at Altamira Group. Genuine Fractals was a plug-in for Photoshop and, for the first time, allowed images to go completely resolution independent—meaning a single image could be scaled from postage stamp to IMAX without loss of quality. Genuine Fractals won Best Product of the Year (EDDY) from Macworld Magazine in 1997 and 1998 [1], and is now an industry standard on version 5 from onOne Software.
