= Transfer matrix =

In wavelet theory

In applied mathematics, the transfer matrix is a formulation in terms of a block-Toeplitz matrix of the two-scale equation, which characterizes refinable functions. Refinable functions play an important role in wavelet theory and finite element theory.

For the mask $h$, which is a vector with component indexes from $a$ to $b$, the transfer matrix of $h$, we call it $T_h$ here, is defined as

$$(T_h)_{j,k} = h_{2\cdot j-k}.$$

More verbosely

$$T_h =
\begin{pmatrix}
h_{a  } &         &         &         &         &   \\
h_{a+2} & h_{a+1} & h_{a  } &         &         &   \\
h_{a+4} & h_{a+3} & h_{a+2} & h_{a+1} & h_{a  } &   \\
\ddots  & \ddots  & \ddots  & \ddots  & \ddots  & \ddots \\
& h_{b  } & h_{b-1} & h_{b-2} & h_{b-3} & h_{b-4} \\
&         &         & h_{b  } & h_{b-1} & h_{b-2} \\
&         &         &         &         & h_{b  }
\end{pmatrix}.$$

The effect of $T_h$ can be expressed in terms of the downsampling operator "$\downarrow$":

$$T_h\cdot x = (h*x)\downarrow 2.$$

== Properties ==
- $T_h\cdot x = T_x\cdot h$.
- If you drop the first and the last column and move the odd-indexed columns to the left and the even-indexed columns to the right, then you obtain a transposed Sylvester matrix.
- The determinant of a transfer matrix is essentially a resultant.
  More precisely:
  Let $h_{\mathrm{e}}$ be the even-indexed coefficients of $h$ ($(h_{\mathrm{e}})_k = h_{2k}$) and let $h_{\mathrm{o}}$ be the odd-indexed coefficients of $h$ ($(h_{\mathrm{o}})_k = h_{2k+1}$).
  Then $\det T_h = (-1)^{\lfloor\frac{b-a+1}{4}\rfloor}\cdot h_a\cdot h_b\cdot\mathrm{res}(h_{\mathrm{e}},h_{\mathrm{o}})$, where $\mathrm{res}$ is the resultant.
  This connection allows for fast computation using the Euclidean algorithm.
- For the trace of the transfer matrix of convolved masks holds
  $\mathrm{tr}~T_{g*h} = \mathrm{tr}~T_g \cdot \mathrm{tr}~T_h$
- For the determinant of the transfer matrix of convolved mask holds
  $\det T_{g*h} = \det T_g \cdot \det T_h \cdot \mathrm{res}(g_-,h)$
  where $g_-$ denotes the mask with alternating signs, i.e. $(g_-)_k = (-1)^k \cdot g_k$.
- If $T_{h}\cdot x = 0$, then $T_{g*h}\cdot (g_-*x) = 0$.
  This is a concretion of the determinant property above. From the determinant property one knows that $T_{g*h}$ is singular whenever $T_{h}$ is singular. This property also tells, how vectors from the null space of $T_{h}$ can be converted to null space vectors of $T_{g*h}$.
- If $x$ is an eigenvector of $T_{h}$ with respect to the eigenvalue $\lambda$, i.e.
  $T_{h}\cdot x = \lambda\cdot x$,
  then $x*(1,-1)$ is an eigenvector of $T_{h*(1,1)}$ with respect to the same eigenvalue, i.e.
  $T_{h*(1,1)}\cdot (x*(1,-1)) = \lambda\cdot (x*(1,-1))$.
- Let $\lambda_a,\dots,\lambda_b$ be the eigenvalues of $T_h$, which implies $\lambda_a+\dots+\lambda_b = \mathrm{tr}~T_h$ and more generally $\lambda_a^n+\dots+\lambda_b^n = \mathrm{tr}(T_h^n)$. This sum is useful for estimating the spectral radius of $T_h$. There is an alternative possibility for computing the sum of eigenvalue powers, which is faster for small $n$.
  Let $C_k h$ be the periodization of $h$ with respect to period $2^k-1$. That is $C_k h$ is a circular filter, which means that the component indexes are residue classes with respect to the modulus $2^k-1$. Then with the upsampling operator $\uparrow$ it holds
  $\mathrm{tr}(T_h^n) = \left(C_k h * (C_k h\uparrow 2) * (C_k h\uparrow 2^2) * \cdots * (C_k h\uparrow 2^{n-1})\right)_{[0]_{2^n-1}}$
  Actually not $n-2$ convolutions are necessary, but only $2\cdot \log_2 n$ ones, when applying the strategy of efficient computation of powers. Even more the approach can be further sped up using the Fast Fourier transform.
- From the previous statement we can derive an estimate of the spectral radius of $\varrho(T_h)$. It holds
  $\varrho(T_h) \ge \frac{a}{\sqrt{\# h}} \ge \frac{1}{\sqrt{3\cdot \# h}}$
  where $\# h$ is the size of the filter and if all eigenvalues are real, it is also true that
  $\varrho(T_h) \le a$,
  where $a = \Vert C_2 h \Vert_2$.

== See also ==
- Hurwitz determinant
