= Genuine Fractals =

Genuine Fractals is a Photoshop plug-in developed and distributed by onOne Software of Portland, Oregon. The original Windows version of Genuine Fractals was designed and developed by Altamira Group in Burbank, California under team leader Steven Bender in 1996. In 1997, Altamira released the Robert McNally-developed Version 2.0 on the Macintosh Platform and the redesigned Windows Version 2.0 product. The Genuine Fractals products were acquired by LizardTech in June 2001, before ultimately being acquired by onOne Software in July 2005.

As of version 7.0, the product was called Perfect Resize, and as of version 10, ON1 Resize. There are two main features in the Genuine Fractals plug-in. First is a feature to save image files in either FIF (Fractal Image Format) or its proprietary STN multi-resolution wavelet format. This format offers file compression ratios around 2:1 for lossless and 5:1 for visually lossless. The second main feature of Genuine Fractals is a scaling algorithm based on the use of PIFS (partitioned iterated function systems). When scaling up, Genuine Fractals exploits the self-similarity of an image to increase its size while preserving detail.

In 1997, Genuine Fractals won a MacWorld Eddy. It is also notable because Genuine Fractals was the first product developed on PC and ported to Mac to win an EDDY.

== See also ==
- Fractal
- Mandelbrot
