= Fractal transform =

Image compression technique

The fractal transform is a technique invented by Michael Barnsley et al. to perform lossy image compression. It is a fractal compression system for digital images which resembles a vector quantization system using the image itself as the codebook.

== Fractal transform compression ==
Start with a digital image A_{1}. Downsample it by a factor of 2 to produce image A_{2}. Now, for each block B_{1} of 4x4 pixels in A_{1}, find the corresponding block B_{2} in A_{2} most similar to B_{1}, and then find the grayscale or RGB offset and gain from A_{2} to B_{2}. For each destination block, output the positions of the source blocks and the color offsets and gains.

== Fractal transform decompression ==
Starting with an empty destination image A_{1}, repeat the following algorithm several times: Downsample A_{1} down by a factor of 2 to produce image A_{2}. Then copy blocks from A_{2} to A_{1} as directed by the compressed data, multiplying by the respective gains and adding the respective color offsets.

This algorithm is guaranteed to converge to an image, and it should appear similar to the original image. In fact, a slight modification of the decompressor to run at block sizes larger than 4x4 pixels produces a method of stretching images without causing the blockiness or blurriness of traditional linear resampling algorithms.

== Patents ==
The basic patents covering Fractal Image Compression, U.S. Patents 4,941,193, 5,065,447, 5,384,867, 5,416,856, and 5,430,812 appear to be expired.

== See also ==
- Image compression
