= Pythagoras tree (fractal) =

Plane fractal constructed from squares

Animation of an imperfectly self-resembling Pythagoras tree

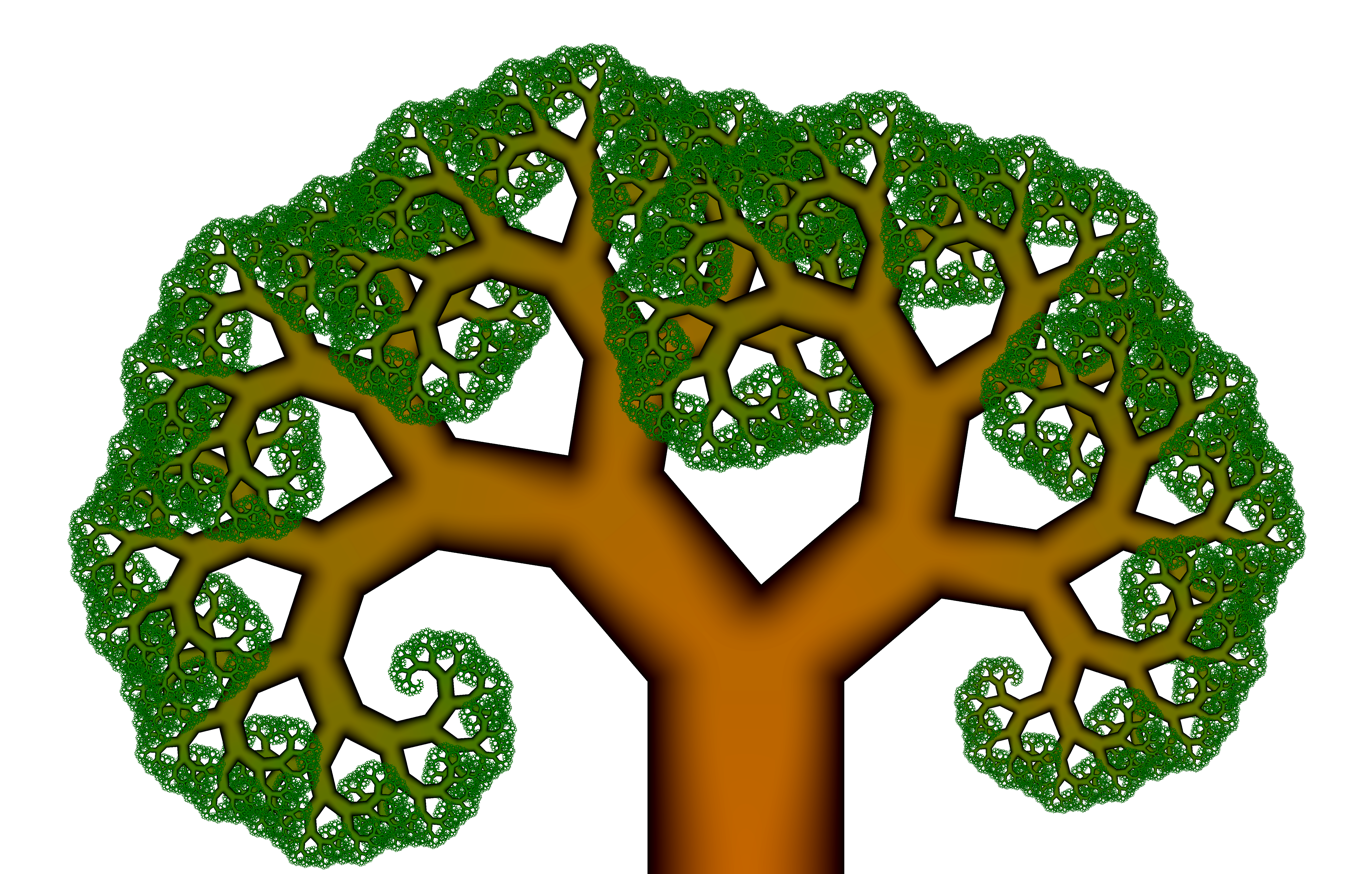
The Pythagoras tree with an angle of 25 degrees and smooth coloring

The Pythagoras tree is a plane fractal constructed from squares. Invented by the Dutch mathematics teacher Albert E. Bosman in 1942, it is named after the ancient Greek mathematician Pythagoras because each triple of touching squares encloses a right triangle, in a configuration traditionally used to depict the Pythagorean theorem. If the largest square has a size of L × L, the entire Pythagoras tree fits snugly inside a box of size 6L × 4L. The finer details of the tree resemble the Lévy C curve.

== Construction ==
The construction of the Pythagoras tree begins with a square. Upon this square are constructed two squares, each scaled down by a linear factor of $\frac{\sqrt{2}}{2}$, such that the corners of the squares coincide pairwise. The same procedure is then applied recursively to the two smaller squares, ad infinitum. The illustration below shows the first few iterations in the construction process.

Construction of the Pythagoras tree, order 0

Order 0

Order 1

Order 1

Order 2

Order 2

Order 3

Order 3

This is the simplest symmetric triangle. Alternatively, the sides of the triangle are recursively equal proportions, leading to the sides being proportional to the square root of the inverse golden ratio, and the areas of the squares being in golden ratio proportion.

== Area ==
Iteration n in the construction adds 2^{n} squares of area $\tfrac{1}{2^n}$, for a total area of 1. Thus the area of the tree might seem to grow without bound in the limit as n → ∞. However, some of the squares overlap starting at the order 5 iteration, and the tree actually has a finite area because it fits inside a 6×4 box.

It can be shown easily that the area A of the Pythagoras tree must be in the range 5 < A < 18, which can be narrowed down further with extra effort. Using an ω-automaton, the area A was computed to be a rational number approximately equal to 14.6133694787, with a numerator and denominator over a hundred digits long when reduced to simplest form.

== Varying the angle ==
An interesting set of variations can be constructed by maintaining an isosceles triangle but changing the base angle (90 degrees for the standard Pythagoras tree). In particular, when the base half-angle is set to (30°) = arcsin(0.5), it is easily seen that the size of the squares remains constant. The first overlap occurs at the fourth iteration. The general pattern produced is the rhombitrihexagonal tiling, an array of hexagons bordered by the constructing squares.

Order 4	Order 10

In the limit where the half-angle is 90 degrees, there is obviously no overlap, and the total area is twice the area of the base square.

The Pythagoras tree was first constructed by Albert E. Bosman (1891–1961), a Dutch mathematics teacher, in 1942.

== See also ==
- Lévy C curve
