= Hurwitz determinant =

In mathematics, Hurwitz determinants were introduced by Adolf Hurwitz (1895), who used them to give a criterion for all roots of a polynomial to have negative real part.

== Definition ==
Consider a characteristic polynomial P in the variable λ of the form:

$$P(\lambda)= a_0 \lambda^n + a_1 \lambda^{n-1} + \cdots + a_{n-1} \lambda + a_n$$

where $a_i$, $i=0,1,\ldots,n$, are real.

The square Hurwitz matrix associated to P is given below:

$$H=
\begin{pmatrix}
a_1 & a_3 & a_5 & \dots & \dots & \dots & 0 & 0 & 0 \\
a_0 & a_2 & a_4 & & & & \vdots & \vdots & \vdots \\
0 & a_1 & a_3 & & & & \vdots & \vdots & \vdots \\
\vdots & a_0 & a_2 & \ddots & & & 0 & \vdots & \vdots \\
\vdots & 0 & a_1 & & \ddots & & a_n & \vdots & \vdots \\
\vdots & \vdots  & a_0 & & & \ddots &  a_{n-1} & 0 & \vdots \\
\vdots & \vdots  & 0 & & & & a_{n-2} & a_n & \vdots \\
\vdots & \vdots & \vdots & & & & a_{n-3} & a_{n-1} & 0 \\
0 & 0 & 0 & \dots & \dots & \dots & a_{n-4} & a_{n-2} & a_n
\end{pmatrix}.$$

The i-th Hurwitz determinant is the i-th leading principal minor (minor is a determinant) of the above Hurwitz matrix H. There are n Hurwitz determinants for a characteristic polynomial of degree n.

== See also ==
- Transfer matrix
