= Hutchinson operator =

In mathematics, in the study of fractals, a Hutchinson operator is the collective action of a set of contractions, called an iterated function system. The iteration of the operator converges to a unique attractor, which is the often self-similar fixed set of the operator.

== Definition ==
Let $\{f_i : X \to X\ |\ 1\leq i \leq N\}$ be an iterated function system, or a set of contractions from a compact set $X$ to itself. The operator $H$ is defined over subsets $S\subset X$ as

$$H(S) = \bigcup_{i=1}^N f_i(S).\,$$

A key question is to describe the attractors $A=H(A)$ of this operator, which are compact sets. One way of generating such a set is to start with an initial compact set $S_0\subset X$ (which can be a single point, called a seed) and iterate $H$ as follows

$$S_{n+1} = H(S_n) = \bigcup_{i=1}^N f_i(S_n)$$

and taking the limit, the iteration converges to the attractor

$$A = \lim_{n \to \infty} S_n .$$

== Properties ==
Hutchinson showed in 1981 the existence and uniqueness of the attractor $A$. The proof follows by showing that the Hutchinson operator is contractive on the set of compact subsets of $X$ in the Hausdorff distance.

The collection of functions $f_i$ together with composition form a monoid. With N functions, then one may visualize the monoid as a full N-ary tree or a Cayley tree.
