= Unavoidable pattern =

Pattern in mathematics and computer science

In mathematics and theoretical computer science, a pattern is an unavoidable pattern if it is unavoidable on any finite alphabet.

== Definitions ==
=== Pattern ===
Like a word, a pattern (also called term) is a sequence of symbols over some alphabet.

The minimum multiplicity of the pattern $p$ is $m(p)=\min(\mathrm{count_p}(x):x \in p)$ where $\mathrm{count_p}(x)$ is the number of occurrence of symbol $x$ in pattern $p$. In other words, it is the number of occurrences in $p$ of the least frequently occurring symbol in $p$.

=== Instance ===
Given finite alphabets $\Sigma$ and $\Delta$, a word $x\in\Sigma^*$ is an instance of the pattern $p\in\Delta^*$ if there exists a non-erasing semigroup morphism $f:\Delta^*\rightarrow\Sigma^*$ such that $f(p)=x$, where $\Sigma^*$ denotes the Kleene star of $\Sigma$. Non-erasing means that $f(a)\neq\varepsilon$ for all $a\in\Delta$, where $\varepsilon$ denotes the empty string.

=== Avoidance / Matching ===
A word $w$ is said to match, or encounter, a pattern $p$ if a factor (also called subword or substring) of $w$ is an instance of $p$. Otherwise, $w$ is said to avoid $p$, or to be $p$-free. This definition can be generalized to the case of an infinite $w$, based on a generalized definition of "substring".

=== Avoidability / Unavoidability on a specific alphabet ===
A pattern $p$ is unavoidable on a finite alphabet $\Sigma$ if each sufficiently long word $x\in\Sigma^*$ must match $p$; formally: if $\exists n\in \Nu. \ \forall x\in\Sigma^*. \ (|x|\geq n \implies x \text{ matches } p)$. Otherwise, $p$ is avoidable on $\Sigma$, which implies there exist infinitely many words over the alphabet $\Sigma$ that avoid $p$.

By Kőnig's lemma, pattern $p$ is avoidable on $\Sigma$ if and only if there exists an infinite word $w\in \Sigma^\omega$ that avoids $p$.

=== Maximal p-free word ===
Given a pattern $p$ and an alphabet $\Sigma$. A $p$-free word $w\in\Sigma^*$ is a maximal $p$-free word over $\Sigma$ if $aw$ and $wa$ match $p$ $\forall a\in\Sigma$.

=== Avoidable / Unavoidable pattern ===
A pattern $p$ is an unavoidable pattern (also called blocking term) if $p$ is unavoidable on any finite alphabet.

If a pattern is unavoidable and not limited to a specific alphabet, then it is unavoidable for any finite alphabet by default. Conversely, if a pattern is said to be avoidable and not limited to a specific alphabet, then it is avoidable on some finite alphabet by default.

=== k-avoidable / k-unavoidable ===
A pattern $p$ is $k$-avoidable if $p$ is avoidable on an alphabet $\Sigma$ of size $k$. Otherwise, $p$ is $k$-unavoidable, which means $p$ is unavoidable on every alphabet of size $k$.

If pattern $p$ is $k$-avoidable, then $p$ is $g$-avoidable for all $g\geq k$.

Given a finite set of avoidable patterns $S=\{p_1,p_2,...,p_i \}$, there exists an infinite word $w\in\Sigma^\omega$ such that $w$ avoids all patterns of $S$. Let $\mu(S)$ denote the size of the minimal alphabet $\Sigma'$such that $\exist w' \in {\Sigma'}^\omega$ avoiding all patterns of $S$.

=== Avoidability index ===
The avoidability index of a pattern $p$ is the smallest $k$ such that $p$ is $k$-avoidable, and $\infin$ if $p$ is unavoidable.

== Properties ==
- A pattern $q$ is avoidable if $q$ is an instance of an avoidable pattern $p$.
- Let avoidable pattern $p$ be a factor of pattern $q$, then $q$ is also avoidable.
- A pattern $q$ is unavoidable if and only if $q$ is a factor of some unavoidable pattern $p$.
- Given an unavoidable pattern $p$ and a symbol $a$ not in $p$, then $pap$ is unavoidable.
- Given an unavoidable pattern $p$, then the reversal $p^R$ is unavoidable.
- Given an unavoidable pattern $p$, there exists a symbol $a$ such that $a$ occurs exactly once in $p$.
- Let $n\in\Nu$ represent the number of distinct symbols of pattern $p$. If $|p|\geq2^n$, then $p$ is avoidable.

== Zimin words ==
Given alphabet $\Delta=\{x_1,x_2,...\}$, Zimin words (patterns) are defined recursively $Z_{n+1}=Z_nx_{n+1}Z_n$ for $n\in\Zeta^+$ and $Z_1=x_1$.

=== Unavoidability ===
All Zimin words are unavoidable.

A word $w$ is unavoidable if and only if it is a factor of a Zimin word.

Given a finite alphabet $\Sigma$, let $f(n,|\Sigma|)$ represent the smallest $m\in\Zeta^+$ such that $w$ matches $Z_n$ for all $w\in \Sigma^m$. We have following properties:

- $f(1,q)=1$
- $f(2,q)=2q+1$
- $f(3,2)=29$
- $f(n,q)\leq{^{n-1}q}=\underbrace{q^{q^{\cdot^{\cdot^{q}}}}}_{n-1}$

$Z_n$ is the longest unavoidable pattern constructed by alphabet $\Delta=\{x_1,x_2,...,x_n\}$ since $|Z_n|=2^n -1$.

== Pattern reduction ==
=== Free letter ===
Given a pattern $p$ over some alphabet $\Delta$, we say $x\in\Delta$ is free for $p$ if there exist subsets $A,B$ of $\Delta$ such that the following hold:

1. $uv$ is a factor of $p$ and $u\in A$ ↔ $uv$ is a factor of $p$ and $v\in B$
2. $x\in A\backslash B\cup B\backslash A$

For example, let $p=abcbab$, then $b$ is free for $p$ since there exist $A=ac,B=b$ satisfying the conditions above.

=== Reduce ===
A pattern $p\in \Delta^*$ reduces to pattern $q$ if there exists a symbol $x\in \Delta$ such that $x$ is free for $p$, and $q$ can be obtained by removing all occurrence of $x$ from $p$. Denote this relation by $p\stackrel{x}{\rightarrow}q$.

For example, let $p=abcbab$, then $p$ can reduce to $q=aca$ since $b$ is free for $p$.

=== Locked ===
A word $w$ is said to be locked if $w$ has no free letter; hence $w$ can not be reduced.

=== Transitivity ===
Given patterns $p,q,r$, if $p$ reduces to $q$ and $q$ reduces to $r$, then $p$ reduces to $r$. Denote this relation by $p\stackrel{*}{\rightarrow}r$.

=== Unavoidability ===
A pattern $p$ is unavoidable if and only if $p$ reduces to a word of length one; hence $\exist w$ such that $|w|=1$ and $p\stackrel{*}{\rightarrow}w$.

== Graph pattern avoidance ==
=== Avoidance / Matching on a specific graph ===
Given a simple graph $G=(V,E)$, a edge coloring $c:E\rightarrow \Delta$ matches pattern $p$ if there exists a simple path $P=[e_1,e_2,...,e_r]$ in $G$ such that the sequence $c(P)=[c(e_1),c(e_2),...,c(e_r)]$ matches $p$. Otherwise, $c$ is said to avoid $p$ or be $p$-free.

Similarly, a vertex coloring $c:V\rightarrow \Delta$ matches pattern $p$ if there exists a simple path $P=[c_1,c_2,...,c_r]$ in $G$ such that the sequence $c(P)$ matches $p$.

=== Pattern chromatic number ===
The pattern chromatic number $\pi_p(G)$ is the minimal number of distinct colors needed for a $p$-free vertex coloring $c$ over the graph $G$.

Let $\pi_p(n)=\max\{\pi_p(G):G\in G_n\}$ where $G_n$ is the set of all simple graphs with a maximum degree no more than $n$.

Similarly, $\pi_p'(G)$ and $\pi_p'(n)$ are defined for edge colorings.

=== Avoidability / Unavoidability on graphs ===
A pattern $p$ is avoidable on graphs if $\pi_p(n)$ is bounded by $c_p$, where $c_p$ only depends on $p$.

- Avoidance on words can be expressed as a specific case of avoidance on graphs; hence a pattern $p$ is avoidable on any finite alphabet if and only if $\pi_p(P_n) \leq c_p$ for all $n \in\Zeta ^+$, where $P_n$ is a graph of $n$ vertices concatenated.

=== Probabilistic bound on π_{p}(n) ===
There exists an absolute constant $c$, such that $\pi_p(n)\leq cn^{\frac{m(p)}{m(p)-1}}\leq cn^2$ for all patterns $p$ with $m(p)\geq2$.

Given a pattern $p$, let $n$ represent the number of distinct symbols of $p$. If $|p|\geq2^n$, then $p$ is avoidable on graphs.

=== Explicit colorings ===
Given a pattern $p$ such that $count_p(x)$ is even for all $x\in p$, then $\pi_p'(K_2^k)\leq2^k-1$ for all $k\geq 1$, where $K_n$ is the complete graph of $n$ vertices.

Given a pattern $p$ such that $m(p)\geq2$, and an arbitrary tree $T$, let $S$ be the set of all avoidable subpatterns and their reflections of $p$. Then $\pi_p(T)\leq 3\mu(S)$.

Given a pattern $p$ such that $m(p)\geq2$, and a tree $T$ with degree $n\geq2$. Let $S$ be the set of all avoidable subpatterns and their reflections of $p$, then $\pi_p'(T)\leq 2(n-1)\mu(S)$.

== Examples ==
- The Thue–Morse sequence is cube-free and overlap-free; hence it avoids the patterns $xxx$ and $xyxyx$.
- A square-free word is one avoiding the pattern $xx$. The word over the alphabet $\{0,\pm1\}$ obtained by taking the first difference of the Thue–Morse sequence is an example of an infinite square-free word.
- The patterns $x$ and $xyx$ are unavoidable on any alphabet, since they are factors of the Zimin words.
- The power patterns $x^n$ for $n\geq 3$ are 2-avoidable.
- All binary patterns can be divided into three categories:
  - $\varepsilon,x,xyx$ are unavoidable.
  - $xx,xxy,xyy,xxyx,xxyy,xyxx,xyxy,xyyx,xxyxx,xxyxy,xyxyy$ have avoidability index of 3.
  - others have avoidability index of 2.
- $abwbaxbcyaczca$ has avoidability index of 4, as well as other locked words.
- $abvacwbaxbcycdazdcd$ has avoidability index of 5.
- The repetitive threshold $RT(n)$ is the infimum of exponents $k$ such that $x^k$ is avoidable on an alphabet of size $n$. Also see Dejean's theorem.

== Open problems ==
- Is there an avoidable pattern $p$ such that the avoidability index of $p$ is 6?
- Given an arbitrarily pattern $p$, is there an algorithm to determine the avoidability index of $p$?
