= Sturmian sequence =

In mathematics, a Sturmian sequence may refer to:

- A Sturmian word: a sequence with minimal complexity function
- A sequence used to determine the number of distinct real roots of a polynomial by Sturm's theorem
