= K-synchronized sequence =

In mathematics and theoretical computer science, a k-synchronized sequence is an infinite sequence of terms s(n) characterized by a finite automaton taking as input two strings m and n, each expressed in some fixed base k, and accepting if m = s(n). The class of k-synchronized sequences lies between the classes of k-automatic sequences and k-regular sequences.

== Definitions ==
=== As relations ===
Let Σ be an alphabet of k symbols where k ≥ 2, and let [n]_{k} denote the base-k representation of some number n. Given r ≥ 2, a subset R of $\mathbb{N}^{r}$ is k-synchronized if the relation {([n_{1}]_{k}, ..., [n_{r}]_{k})} is a right-synchronized rational relation over Σ^{∗} × ... × Σ^{∗}, where (n_{1}, ..., n_{r}) $\in$ R.

=== Language-theoretic ===
Let n ≥ 0 be a natural number and let f: $\mathbb{N} \rightarrow \mathbb{N}$ be a map, where both n and f(n) are expressed in base k. The sequence f(n) is k-synchronized if the language of pairs $\{(n, f(n))\}$ is regular.

== History ==
The class of k-synchronized sequences was introduced by Carpi and Maggi.

== Example ==
=== Subword complexity ===
Given a k-automatic sequence s(n) and an infinite string S = s(1)s(2)..., let ρ_{S}(n) denote the subword complexity of S; that is, the number of distinct subwords of length n in S. Goč, Schaeffer, and Shallit demonstrated that there exists a finite automaton accepting the language

$$\{(n, m)_k \mid n \geq 0 \text{ and } m = \rho_S(n)\}.$$

This automaton guesses the endpoints of every contiguous block of symbols in S and verifies that each subword of length n starting within a given block is novel while all other subwords are not. It then verifies that m is the sum of the sizes of the blocks. Since the pair (n, m)_{k} is accepted by this automaton, the subword complexity function of the k-automatic sequence s(n) is k-synchronized.

== Properties ==
k-synchronized sequences exhibit a number of interesting properties. A non-exhaustive list of these properties is presented below.

- Every k-synchronized sequence is k-regular.
- Every k-automatic sequence is k-synchronized. To be precise, a sequence s(n) is k-automatic if and only if s(n) is k-synchronized and s(n) takes on finitely many terms. This is an immediate consequence of both the above property and the fact that every k-regular sequence taking on finitely many terms is k-automatic.
- The class of k-synchronized sequences is closed under termwise sum and termwise composition.
- The terms of any k-synchronized sequence have a linear growth rate.
- If s(n) is a k-synchronized sequence, then both the subword complexity of s(n) and the palindromic complexity of s(n) (similar to subword complexity, but for distinct palindromes) are k-regular sequences.
