= Critical exponent of a word =

In mathematics and computer science, the critical exponent of a finite or infinite sequence of symbols over a finite alphabet describes the largest number of times a contiguous subsequence can be repeated. For example, the critical exponent of "Mississippi" is 7/3, as it contains the string "ississi", which is of length 7 and period 3.

If w is an infinite word over the alphabet A and x is a finite word over A, then x is said to occur in w with exponent α, for positive real α, if there is a factor y of w with y = x^{a}x_{0} where x_{0} is a prefix of x, a is the integer part of α, and the length |y| = α |x|: we say that y is an α-power. The word w is α-power-free if it contains no factors which are β-powers for any β ≥ α.

The critical exponent for w is the supremum of the α for which w has α-powers, or equivalently the infimum of the α for which w is α-power-free.

== Definition ==
If $\mathbf{w}$ is a word (possibly infinite), then the critical exponent of $\mathbf{w}$ is defined to be

$$E(\mathbf{w}) = \sup \{ r \in \mathbb{Q}^{\geq 1} : \mathbf{w} \, \text{ contains an } \, r \text{-power}\}$$

where $\mathbb{Q}^{\geq 1} = \{ q \in \mathbb{Q} : q \geq 1 \}$.

== Examples ==
- The critical exponent of the Fibonacci word is (5 + √5)/2 ≈ 3.618.
- The critical exponent of the Thue–Morse sequence is 2. The word contains arbitrarily long squares, but in any factor xxb the letter b is not a prefix of x.

== Properties ==
- The critical exponent can take any real value greater than 1.
- The critical exponent of a morphic word over a finite alphabet is either infinite or an algebraic number of degree at most the size of the alphabet.

== Repetition threshold ==
The repetition threshold of an alphabet A of n letters is the minimum critical exponent of infinite words over A: clearly this value RT(n) depends only on n. For n=2, any binary word of length four has a factor of exponent 2, and since the critical exponent of the Thue–Morse sequence is 2, the repetition threshold for binary alphabets is RT(2) = 2. It is known that RT(3) = 7/4, RT(4) = 7/5 and that RT(n) = n/(n-1) for n ≥ 5.

== See also ==
- Critical exponent of a physical system
