= Büchi arithmetic =

Büchi arithmetic of base k is the first-order theory of the natural numbers with addition and the function $V_k(x)$ which is defined as the largest power of k dividing x, named in honor of the Swiss mathematician Julius Richard Büchi. The signature of Büchi arithmetic contains only the addition operation, $V_k$ and equality, omitting the multiplication operation entirely.

Unlike Peano arithmetic, Büchi arithmetic is a decidable theory. This means it is possible to effectively determine, for any sentence in the language of Büchi arithmetic, whether that sentence is provable from the axioms of Büchi arithmetic.

== Büchi arithmetic and automata ==
A subset $X\subseteq \mathbb N^n$ is definable in Büchi arithmetic of base k if and only if it is k-recognisable.

If $n=1$ this means that the set of integers of X in base k is accepted by an automaton. Similarly if $n>1$ there exists an automaton that reads the first digits, then the second digits, and so on, of n integers in base k, and accepts the words if the n integers are in the relation X.

== Properties of Büchi arithmetic ==
If k and l are multiplicatively dependent, then the Büchi arithmetics of base k and l have the same expressivity. Indeed $V_l$ can be defined in $\text{FO}(V_k,+)$, the first-order theory of $V_k$ and $+$.

Otherwise, an arithmetic theory with both $V_k$ and $V_l$ functions is equivalent to Peano arithmetic, which has both addition and multiplication, since multiplication is definable in $\text{FO}(V_k,V_l,+)$.

Further, by the Cobham–Semënov theorem, if a relation is definable in both k and l Büchi arithmetics, then it is definable in Presburger arithmetic.
