= Mojżesz Presburger =

Polish mathematician, logician, and philosopher (1904 – c. 1943)

- Mojżesz Presburger, 1923
- Born: 27 December 1904; Warsaw
- Died: c. 1943
- Cause of death: Holocaust
- Citizenship: Polish
- Known for: Presburger arithmetic
- Spouse: Rebeka Krejnes
- Scientific career
- Thesis: O zupełności pewnego systemu arytmetyki liczb całkowitych (About the completeness of a certain system of integer arithmetic in which addition is the only operation) (M.A. Diploma, 1930)

Signature
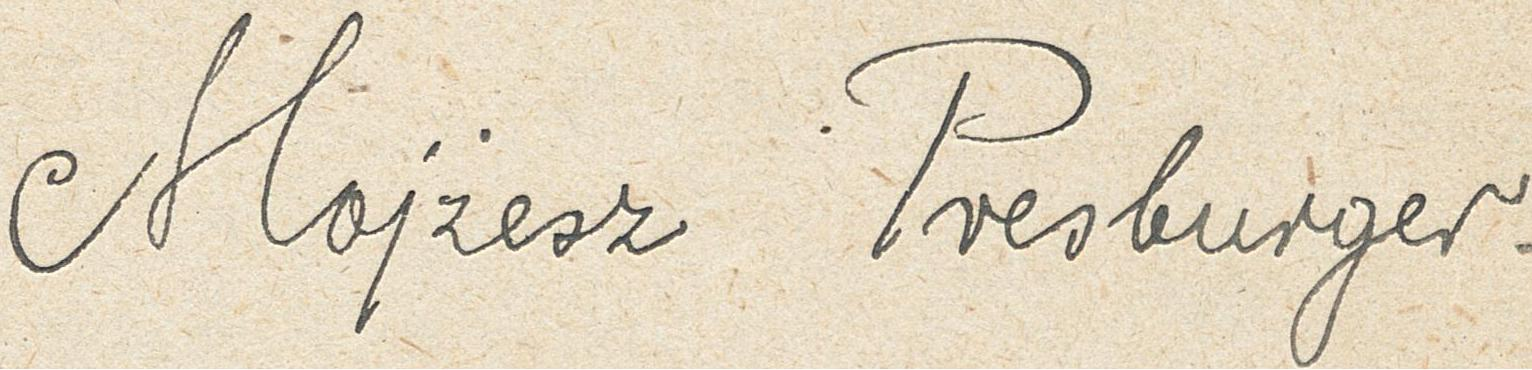

Mojżesz Presburger, or Prezburger, (Polish pronunciation: [ˈmɔjʐɛʂ prɛzˈburgɛr]; 27 December 1904 – c. 1943) was a Polish Jewish mathematician, logician, and philosopher. He was a student of Alfred Tarski, Jan Łukasiewicz, Kazimierz Ajdukiewicz, and Kazimierz Kuratowski. He is known for, among other things, having invented Presburger arithmetic as a student in 1929 – a form of arithmetic in which one allows induction but removes multiplication, to obtain a decidable theory.

He was born in Warsaw on 27 December 1904 to Abram Chaim Prezburger and Joehwet Prezburger (née Aszenmil). On 28 May 1923 he got his matura from the School of Commerce of the Merchants' Meeting of Warsaw. On 7 October 1930 he was awarded master in mathematics from Warsaw University. He died in the Holocaust, probably 1943.

In 2010, the European Association for Theoretical Computer Science began conferring the annual Presburger Award named after him to a young scientist (in exceptional cases to several young scientists) for outstanding contributions in theoretical computer science. Mikołaj Bojańczyk was the first recipient.
