= Square-free word =

In combinatorics, a square-free word is a word (a sequence of symbols) that does not contain any squares. A square is a word of the form XX, where X is not empty. Thus, a square-free word can also be defined as a word that avoids the pattern XX.

== Finite square-free words ==
=== Binary alphabet ===
Over a binary alphabet $\{0,1\}$, the only square-free words are the empty word $\epsilon,0,1,01,10,010$, and $101$.

=== Ternary alphabet ===
Over a ternary alphabet $\{0,1,2\}$, there are infinitely many square-free words. It is possible to count the number $c(n)$ of ternary square-free words of length n.

The number of ternary square-free words of length n
n	0	1	2	3	4	5	6	7	8	9	10	11	12
$c(n)$	1	3	6	12	18	30	42	60	78	108	144	204	264

This number is bounded by $c(n) = \Theta(\alpha^n)$, where $1.3017597 < \alpha < 1.3017619$. The upper bound on $\alpha$ can be found via Fekete's Lemma and approximation by automata. The lower bound can be found by finding a substitution that preserves square-freeness.

=== Alphabet with more than three letters ===
Since there are infinitely many square-free words over three-letter alphabets, this implies there are also infinitely many square-free words over an alphabet with more than three letters.

The following table shows the exact growth rate of the k-ary square-free words, rounded off to 7 digits after the decimal point, for k in the range from 4 to 15:

Growth rate of the k-ary square-free words
alphabet size (k)	4	5	6	7	8	9
growth rate	2.6215080	3.7325386	4.7914069	5.8284661	6.8541173	7.8729902
alphabet size (k)	10	11	12	13	14	15
growth rate	8.8874856	9.8989813	10.9083279	11.9160804	12.9226167	13.9282035

==== 2-dimensional words ====
Consider a map $\textbf{w}$ from $\mathbb{N}^2$ to A, where A is an alphabet and $\textbf{w}$ is called a 2-dimensional word. Let $w_{m,n}$ be the entry $\textbf{w}(m,n)$. A word $\textbf{x}$ is a line of $\textbf{w}$ if there exists $i_1,i_2,j_1, j_2$such that $\text{gcd}(j_1, j_2) = 1$, and for $t \ge 0, x_t = w_{{i_1}+{j_1t},{i_2}+{j_2t}}$.

Carpi proves that there exists a 2-dimensional word $\textbf{w}$ over a 16-letter alphabet such that every line of $\textbf{w}$ is square-free. A computer search shows that there are no 2-dimensional words $\textbf{w}$ over a 7-letter alphabet, such that every line of $\textbf{w}$ is square-free.

=== Generating finite square-free words ===
Shur proposes an algorithm called R2F (random-t(w)o-free) that can generate a square-free word of length n over any alphabet with three or more letters. This algorithm is based on a modification of entropy compression: it randomly selects letters from a k-letter alphabet to generate a $(k+1)$-ary square-free word.

algorithm R2F is
    input: alphabet size 
  
    
      
        k
        ≥
        2
      
    
    {\displaystyle k\geq 2}
  
,
           word length 
  
    
      
        n
        >
        1
      
    
    {\displaystyle n>1}
  

    output: a 
  
    
      
        (
        k
        +
        1
        )
      
    
    {\displaystyle (k+1)}
  
-ary square-free word w of length n.

    (Note that 
  
    
      
        
          
            Σ
            
              k
              +
              1
            
          
        
      
    
    {\textstyle \color {gray}\Sigma _{k+1}}
  
 is the alphabet with letters 
  
    
      
        
          {
          1
          ,
          .
          .
          .
          ,
          k
          +
          1
          }
        
      
    
    {\displaystyle \color {gray}\{1,...,k+1\}}
  
.)
    (For a word 
  
    
      
        
          w
          ∈
          
            Σ
            
              k
            
          
        
      
    
    {\displaystyle \color {gray}w\in \Sigma _{k}}
  
, 
  
    
      
        
          
            χ
            
              w
            
          
        
      
    
    {\displaystyle \color {gray}\chi _{w}}
  
 is the permutation of 
  
    
      
        
          
            Σ
            
              k
            
          
        
      
    
    {\displaystyle \color {gray}\Sigma _{k}}
  
 such that a precedes b in 
  
    
      
        
          
            χ
            
              w
            
          
        
      
    
    {\displaystyle \color {gray}\chi _{w}}
  
 if the 
     right most position of a in w is to the right of the rightmost position of b in w.
     For example,  
  
    
      
        
          w
          =
          136263163
          ∈
          
            Σ
            
              6
            
          
        
      
    
    {\displaystyle \color {gray}w=136263163\in \Sigma _{6}}
  
 has 
  
    
      
        
          
            χ
            
              w
            
          
          =
          361245
        
      
    
    {\displaystyle \color {gray}\chi _{w}=361245}
  
.)

    choose 
  
    
      
        w
        [
        1
        ]
      
    
    {\displaystyle w[1]}
  
 in 
  
    
      
        
          Σ
          
            k
            +
            1
          
        
      
    
    {\textstyle \Sigma _{k+1}}
  
 uniformly at random 
    set 
  
    
      
        
          χ
          
            w
          
        
      
    
    {\displaystyle \chi _{w}}
  
 to 
  
    
      
        w
        [
        1
        ]
      
    
    {\displaystyle w[1]}
  
 followed by all other letters of 
  
    
      
        
          Σ
          
            k
            +
            1
          
        
      
    
    {\textstyle \Sigma _{k+1}}
  
 in increasing order
    set the number N of iterations to 0

    while 
  
    
      
        
          |
        
        w
        
          |
        
        <
        n
      
    
    {\displaystyle |w|<n}
  
 do
        choose j in 
  
    
      
        
          Σ
          
            k
          
        
      
    
    {\textstyle \Sigma _{k}}
  
 uniformly at random
        append 
  
    
      
        a
        =
        
          χ
          
            w
          
        
        [
        j
        +
        1
        ]
      
    
    {\displaystyle a=\chi _{w}[j+1]}
  
 to the end of w
        update 
  
    
      
        
          χ
          
            w
          
        
      
    
    {\displaystyle \chi _{w}}
  
 shifting the first j elements to the right and setting 
  
    
      
        
          χ
          
            w
          
        
        [
        1
        ]
        =
        a
      
    
    {\displaystyle \chi _{w}[1]=a}
  

        increment N by 1
        if w ends with a square of rank r then
            delete the last r letters of w

    return w

Every (k+1)-ary square-free word can be the output of Algorithm R2F, because on each iteration it can append any letter except for the last letter of w.

The expected number of random k-ary letters used by Algorithm R2F to construct a $(k+1)$-ary square-free word of length n is
$$N=n\left(1 + \frac 2 {k^2} + \frac 1 {k^3} + \frac 4 {k^4} + O\left(\frac 1 {k^5}\right)\right)+O(1).$$
Note that there exists an algorithm that can verify the square-freeness of a word of length n in $O(n \log n)$ time. Apostolico and Preparata give an algorithm using suffix trees. Crochemore uses partitioning in his algorithm. Main and Lorentz provide an algorithm based on the divide-and-conquer method. A naive implementation may require $O(n^2)$ time to verify the square-freeness of a word of length n.

== Infinite square-free words ==
There exist infinitely long square-free words in any alphabet with three or more letters, as proved by Axel Thue.

=== Examples ===
==== First difference of the Thue–Morse sequence ====
One example of an infinite square-free word over an alphabet of size 3 is the word over the alphabet $\{-1,0,+1\}$ obtained by taking the first difference of the Thue–Morse sequence. That is, from the Thue–Morse sequence

$$0, 1 ,1, 0 ,1 ,0 ,0 ,1, 1 ,0 ,0 ,1, 0 ,1 ,1, 0 ...$$

one forms a new sequence in which each term is the difference of two consecutive terms of the Thue–Morse sequence. The resulting square-free word is

$1,0,-1,1,-1,0,1,0,-1,0,1,-1,1,0,-1,...$(sequence A029883 in the OEIS).

==== Leech's morphism ====
Another example found by John Leech is defined recursively over the alphabet $\{0,1,2\}$. Let $w_1$ be any square-free word starting with the letter 0. Define the words $\{w_i \mid i \in \mathbb{N} \}$ recursively as follows: the word $w_{i+1}$ is obtained from $w_i$ by replacing each 0 in $w_i$ with 0121021201210, each 1 with 1202102012021, and each 2 with 2010210120102. It is possible to prove that the sequence converges to the infinite square-free word

0121021201210120210201202120102101201021202102012021...

=== Generating infinite square-free words ===
Infinite square-free words can be generated by square-free morphism. A morphism is called square-free if the image of every square-free word is square-free. A morphism is called k–square-free if the image of every square-free word of length k is square-free.

Crochemore proves that a uniform morphism h is square-free if and only if it is 3-square-free. In other words, h is square-free if and only if $h(w)$ is square-free for all square-free w of length 3. It is possible to find a square-free morphism by brute-force search.

algorithm square-free_morphism is
    output: a square-free morphism with the lowest possible rank k.

    set 
  
    
      
        k
        =
        3
      
    
    {\displaystyle k=3}
  

    while True do
        set k_sf_words to the list of all square-free words of length k over a ternary alphabet
        for each 
  
    
      
        h
        (
        0
        )
      
    
    {\displaystyle h(0)}
  
 in k_sf_words do
            for each 
  
    
      
        h
        (
        1
        )
      
    
    {\displaystyle h(1)}
  
 in k_sf_words do
                for each 
  
    
      
        h
        (
        2
        )
      
    
    {\displaystyle h(2)}
  
 in k_sf_words do
                    if 
  
    
      
        h
        (
        1
        )
        =
        h
        (
        2
        )
      
    
    {\displaystyle h(1)=h(2)}
  
 then
                        break from the current loop (advance to next 
  
    
      
        h
        (
        1
        )
      
    
    {\displaystyle h(1)}
  
)
                    if 
  
    
      
        h
        (
        0
        )
        ≠
        h
        (
        1
        )
      
    
    {\displaystyle h(0)\neq h(1)}
  
 and 
  
    
      
        h
        (
        2
        )
        ≠
        h
        (
        0
        )
      
    
    {\displaystyle h(2)\neq h(0)}
  
 then
                        if 
  
    
      
        h
        (
        w
        )
      
    
    {\displaystyle h(w)}
  
 is square-free for all square-free w of length 3 then
                            return 
  
    
      
        h
        (
        0
        )
        ,
        h
        (
        1
        )
        ,
        h
        (
        2
        )
      
    
    {\displaystyle h(0),h(1),h(2)}
  

        increment k by 1

Over a ternary alphabet, there are exactly 144 uniform square-free morphisms of rank 11 and no uniform square-free morphisms with a lower rank than 11.

To obtain an infinite square-free words, start with any square-free word such as 0, and successively apply a square-free morphism h to it. The resulting words preserve the property of square-freeness. For example, let h be a square-free morphism, then as $w \to \infty$, $h^{w}(0)$ is an infinite square-free word.

Note that, if a morphism over a ternary alphabet is not uniform, then this morphism is square-free if and only if it is 5-square-free.

== Letter combinations in square-free words ==
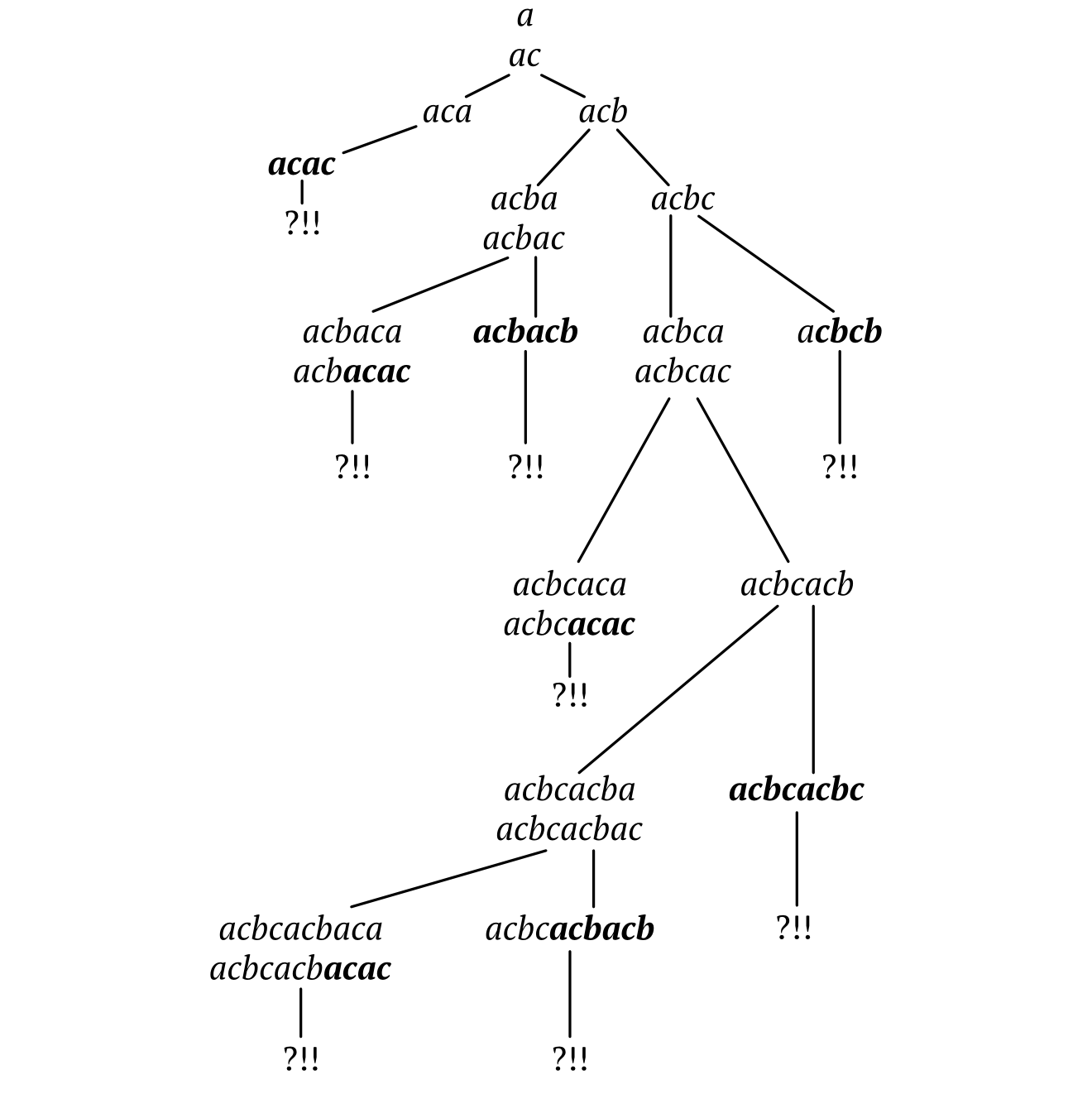
Extending a square-free word to avoid ab.

=== Avoid two-letter combinations ===
Over a ternary alphabet, a square-free word of length more than 13 contains all the square-free two-letter combinations.

This can be proved by constructing a square-free word without the two-letter combination ab. As a result, bcbacbcacbaca is the longest square-free word without the combination ab and its length is equal to 13.

Note that over a more than three-letter alphabet there are square-free words of any length without an arbitrary two-letter combination.

=== Avoid three-letter combinations ===
Over a ternary alphabet, a square-free word of length more than 36 contains all the square-free three-letter combinations.

Note that over a more than three-letter alphabet there are square-free words of any length without an arbitrary three-letter combination.

=== Density of a letter ===
The density of a letter a in a finite word w is defined as $\frac{|w|_a}{|w|}$ where $|w|_a$ is the number of occurrences of a in $w$ and $|w|$ is the length of the word. The density of a letter a in an infinite word is $\liminf_{l\to \infty}\frac{|w_l|_a}{|w_l|}$ where $w_l$ is the prefix of the word w of length l.

The minimal density of a letter a in an infinite ternary square-free word is equal to $\frac{883}{3215} \approx 0.2747$.

The maximum density of a letter a in an infinite ternary square-free word is equal to $\frac{255}{653} \approx 0.3905$.
