= Cutting sequence =

Records individual grid lines crossed ("cut") as a curve crosses a square grid

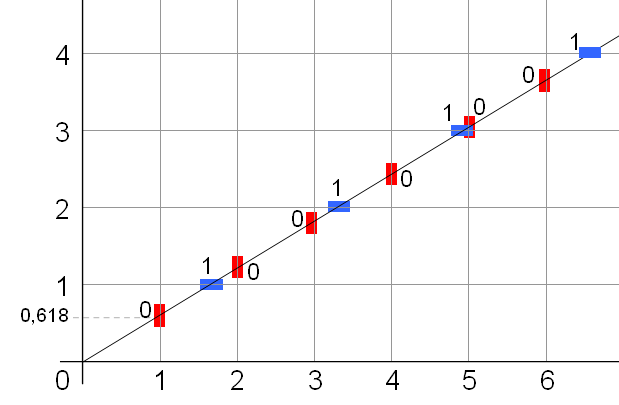
The Fibonacci word is an example of a Sturmian word. The start of the cutting sequence shown here illustrates the start of the word 0100101001.

In digital geometry, a cutting sequence is a sequence of symbols whose elements correspond to the individual grid lines crossed ("cut") as a curve crosses a square grid.

Sturmian words are a special case of cutting sequences where the curves are straight lines of irrational slope.
