= Rauzy fractal =

Fractal set

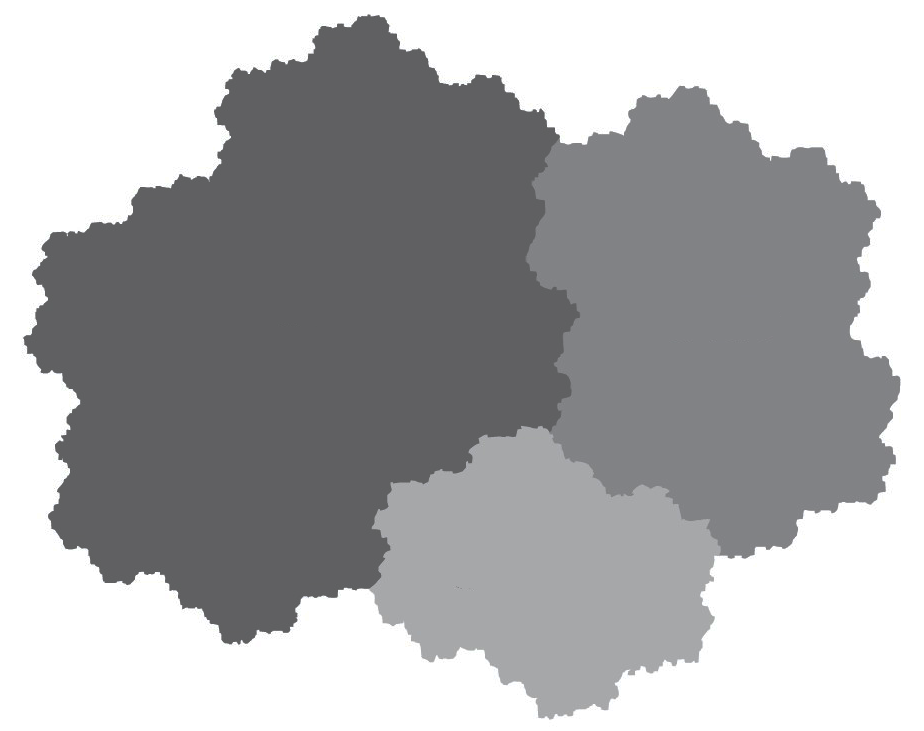
Rauzy fractal

In mathematics, the Rauzy fractal is a fractal set associated with the Tribonacci substitution

$$s(1)=12,\  s(2)=13,\  s(3)=1 \,.$$

It was studied in 1981 by Gérard Rauzy, with the idea of generalizing the dynamic properties of the Fibonacci morphism. That fractal set can be generalized to other maps over a 3-letter alphabet, generating other fractal sets with interesting properties, such as periodic tiling of the plane and self-similarity in three homothetic parts.

== Definitions ==
=== Tribonacci word ===
The infinite tribonacci word is a word constructed by iteratively applying the Tribonacci or Rauzy map : $s(1)=12$, $s(2)=13$, $s(3)=1$. It is an example of a morphic word. Starting from 1, the Tribonacci words are:

- $t_0 = 1$
- $t_1 = 12$
- $t_2 = 1213$
- $t_3 = 1213121$
- $t_4 = 1213121121312$

We can show that, for $n>2$, $t_n = t_{n-1}t_{n-2}t_{n-3}$; hence the name "Tribonacci".

=== Fractal construction ===
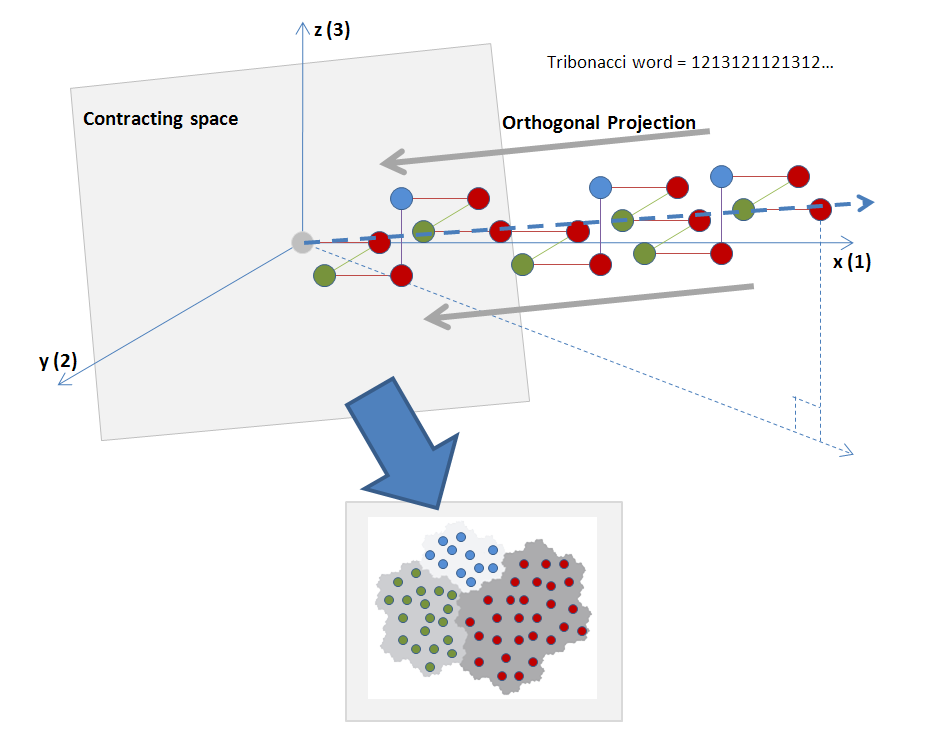
Construction

Consider, now, the space $R^3$ with cartesian coordinates (x,y,z). The Rauzy fractal is constructed this way:

1) Interpret the sequence of letters of the infinite Tribonacci word as a sequence of unitary vectors of the space, with the following rules (1 = direction x, 2 = direction y, 3 = direction z).

2) Then, build a "stair" by tracing the points reached by this sequence of vectors (see figure). For example, the first points are:

- $1 \Rightarrow (1, 0, 0)$
- $2 \Rightarrow (1, 1, 0)$
- $1 \Rightarrow (2, 1, 0)$
- $3 \Rightarrow (2, 1, 1)$
- $1 \Rightarrow (3, 1, 1)$

etc...Every point can be colored according to the corresponding letter, to stress the self-similarity property.

3) Then, project those points on the contracting plane (plane orthogonal to the main direction of propagation of the points, none of those projected points escape to infinity).

== Properties ==
- Can be tiled by three copies of itself, with area reduced by factors $k$, $k^2$ and $k^3$ with $k$ solution of $k^3+k^2+k-1=0$: $k = \frac{1}{3}\left(-1-\frac{2}{\sqrt[3]{17+3 \sqrt{33}}}+\sqrt[3]{17+3 \sqrt{33}}\right) = 0.543689...$.
- Stable under exchanging pieces. We can obtain the same set by exchanging the place of the pieces.
- Connected and simply connected. Has no hole.
- Tiles the plane periodically, by translation.
- The matrix of the Tribonacci map has $x^3 - x^2 - x -1$ as its characteristic polynomial. Its eigenvalues are a real number $\beta = 1.839286...$, called the Tribonacci constant, a Pisot number, and two complex conjugates $\alpha$ and $\bar \alpha$ with $\alpha \bar \alpha=1/\beta$.
- Its boundary is fractal, and the Hausdorff dimension of this boundary equals 1.093364... (sequence A272408 in the OEIS), the solution of $2|\alpha|^{3s}+|\alpha|^{4s}=1$.

== Variants and generalization ==
For any unimodular substitution of Pisot type, which verifies a coincidence condition (apparently always verified), one can construct a similar set called "Rauzy fractal of the map". They all display self-similarity and generate, for the examples below, a periodic tiling of the plane.

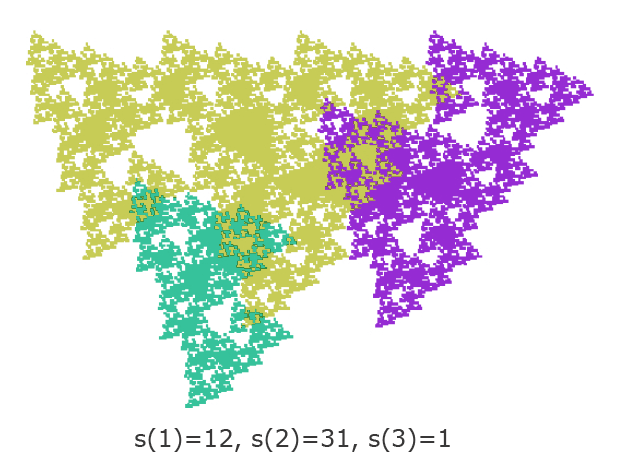
s(1)=12, s(2)=31, s(3)=1

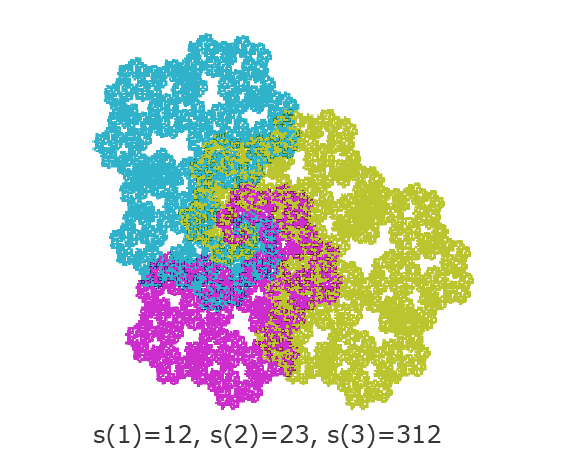
s(1)=12, s(2)=23, s(3)=312

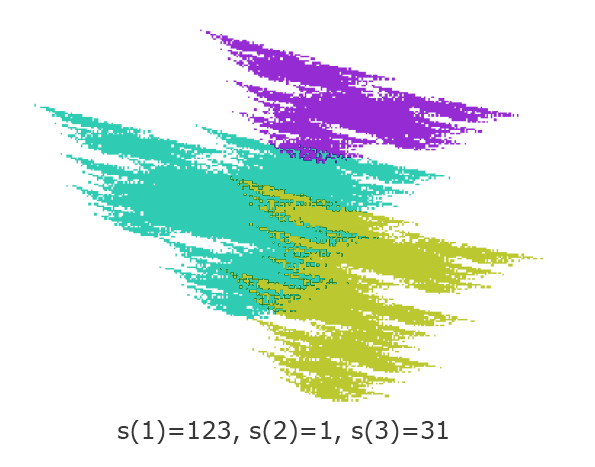
s(1)=123, s(2)=1, s(3)=31

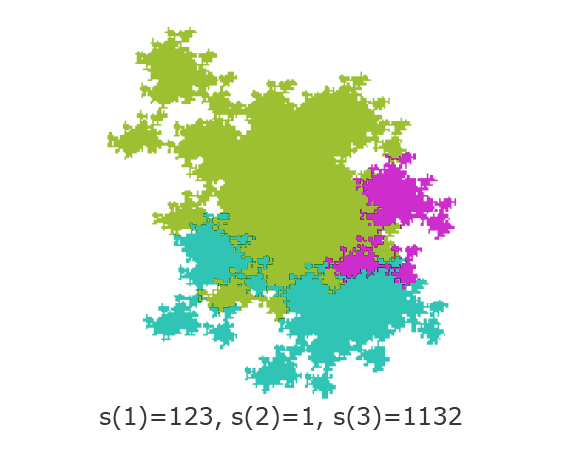
s(1)=123, s(2)=1, s(3)=1132

== See also ==
- List of fractals
