= Theory of Computing Systems =

- Discipline: Theoretical computer science
- Language: English
- Edited by: Mitsunori Ogihara

Publication details
- Former name: Mathematical Systems Theory
- History: 1967–present
- Publisher: Springer Verlag
- Frequency: 8/year
- Open access: no

Standard abbreviations
- ISO 4: Theory Comput. Syst.

Indexing
- ISSN: 1432-4350 (print); 1433-0490 (web)

Links
- Journal homepage

Theory of Computing Systems is a peer-reviewed scientific journal published by Springer Verlag.

Published since 1967 as Mathematical Systems Theory and since volume 30 in 1997 under its current title, it is devoted to publishing original research from all areas of theoretical computer science, such as computational complexity, algorithms and data structures, or parallel and distributed algorithms and architectures. It is published 8 times per year since 2018, although the frequency varied in the past.
