= Complexity function =

Function that counts distinct factors of a string

In computer science, the complexity function of a word or string (a finite or infinite sequence of symbols from some alphabet) is the function that counts the number of distinct factors (substrings of consecutive symbols) of that string. More generally, the complexity function of a formal language (a set of finite strings) counts the number of distinct words of given length.

== Complexity function of a word ==
Let u be a (possibly infinite) sequence of symbols from an alphabet. Define the function p_{u}(n) of a positive integer n to be the number of different factors (consecutive substrings) of length n from the string u.

For a string u of length at least n over an alphabet of size k we clearly have

$$1 \le p_u(n) \le k^n \ ,$$

the bounds being achieved by the constant word and a disjunctive word, for example, the Champernowne word respectively. For infinite words u, we have p_{u}(n) bounded if u is ultimately periodic (a finite, possibly empty, sequence followed by a finite cycle). Conversely, if p_{u}(n) ≤ n for some n, then u is ultimately periodic.

An aperiodic sequence is one which is not ultimately periodic. An aperiodic sequence has strictly increasing complexity function (this is the Morse–Hedlund theorem), so p(n) is at least n+1.

A set S of finite binary words is balanced if for each n the subset S_{n} of words of length n has the property that the Hamming weight of the words in S_{n} takes at most two distinct values. A balanced sequence is one for which the set of factors is balanced. A balanced sequence has complexity function at most n+1.

A Sturmian word over a binary alphabet is one with complexity function n + 1. A sequence is Sturmian if and only if it is balanced and aperiodic. An example is the Fibonacci word. More generally, a Sturmian word over an alphabet of size k is one with complexity n+k−1. An Arnoux-Rauzy word over a ternary alphabet has complexity 2n + 1: an example is the Tribonacci word.

For recurrent words, those in which each factor appears infinitely often, the complexity function almost characterises the set of factors: if s is a recurrent word with the same complexity function as t are then s has the same set of factors as t or δt where δ denotes the letter doubling morphism a → aa.

== Complexity function of a language ==
Let L be a language over an alphabet and define the function p_{L}(n) of a positive integer n to be the number of different words of length n in L The complexity function of a word is thus the complexity function of the language consisting of the factors of that word.

The complexity function of a language is less constrained than that of a word. For example, it may be bounded but not eventually constant: the complexity function of the regular language $a(bb)^*a$ takes values 3 and 4 on odd and even n≥2 respectively. There is an analogue of the Morse–Hedlund theorem: if the complexity of L satisfies p_{L}(n) ≤ n for some n, then p_{L} is bounded and there is a finite language F such that

$$L \subseteq \{ x y^k z : x,y,z \in F,\ k \in \mathbb{N} \} \ .$$

A polynomial or sparse language is one for which the complexity function p(n) is bounded by a fixed power of n. A regular language which is not polynomial is exponential: there are infinitely many n for which p(n) is greater than k^{n} for some fixed k > 1.

== Related concepts ==
The topological entropy of an infinite sequence u is defined by

$$H_{\mathrm{top}}(u) = \lim_{n \rightarrow \infty} \frac{\log p_u(n)}{n \log k} \ .$$

The limit exists as the logarithm of the complexity function is subadditive. Every real number between 0 and 1 occurs as the topological entropy of some sequence is applicable, which may be taken to be uniformly recurrent or even uniquely ergodic.

For x a real number and b an integer ≥ 2 then the complexity function of x in base b is the complexity function p(x,b,n) of the sequence of digits of x written in base b. If x is an irrational number then p(x,b,n) ≥ n+1; if x is rational then p(x,b,n) ≤ C for some constant C depending on x and b. It is conjectured that for algebraic irrational x the complexity is b^{n} (which would follow if all such numbers were normal) but all that is known in this case is that p grows faster than any linear function of n.

The abelian complexity function p^{ab}(n) similarly counts the number of occurrences of distinct factors of given length n, where now we identify factors that differ only by a permutation of the positions. Clearly p^{ab}(n) ≤ p(n). The abelian complexity of a Sturmian sequence satisfies p^{ab}(n) = 2.
