= Multiplicative independence =

In number theory, two positive integers a and b are said to be multiplicatively independent if their only common integer power is 1. That is, for integers n and m, $a^n=b^m$ implies $n=m=0$. Two integers which are not multiplicatively independent are said to be multiplicatively dependent.

As examples, 36 and 216 are multiplicatively dependent since $36^3=(6^2)^3=(6^3)^2=216^2$, whereas 2 and 3 are multiplicatively independent.

== Properties ==
Being multiplicatively independent admits some other characterizations. a and b are multiplicatively independent if and only if $\log(a)/\log(b)$ is irrational. This property holds independently of the base of the logarithm.

Let $a = p_1^{\alpha_1}p_2^{\alpha_2} \cdots p_k^{\alpha_k}$ and $b = q_1^{\beta_1}q_2^{\beta_2} \cdots q_l^{\beta_l}$ be the canonical representations of a and b. The integers a and b are multiplicatively dependent if and only if k = l, $p_i=q_i$ and $\frac{\alpha_i}{\beta_i}=\frac{\alpha_j}{\beta_j}$ for all i and j.

== Applications ==
Büchi arithmetic in base a and b define the same sets if and only if a and b are multiplicatively dependent.

Let a and b be multiplicatively dependent integers, that is, there exists n,m>1 such that $a^n=b^m$. The integers c such that the length of its expansion in base a is at most m are exactly the integers such that the length of their expansion in base b is at most n. It implies that computing the base b expansion of a number, given its base a expansion, can be done by transforming consecutive sequences of m base a digits into consecutive sequence of n base b digits.
