= List of things named after Wacław Sierpiński =

This is a list of things named after Wacław Sierpiński (1882–1969), a Polish mathematician known especially for his contributions to set theory, number theory, theory of functions, and topology:

== Mathematics ==
- Sierpiński triangle
- Sierpiński carpet
- Sierpiński's constant
- Sierpiński cube
- Sierpiński curve
- Sierpiński game
- Sierpiński graph
- Sierpiński number
- Sierpiński set
- Sierpiński space
- Sierpiński's theorem on metric spaces
- Sierpiński problem
- Prime Sierpiński problem
- Extended Sierpiński problem
- Sierpiński-Riesel problem

== Other ==
- Sierpinski (crater), a crater on the Moon
- Sierpiński Medal, an award conferred by the University of Warsaw and the Polish Mathematical Society
