= Andreas Brandstädt =

German mathematician and computer scientist (born 1949)

- Born: 17 January 1949 (age 77); Arnstadt, East Germany
- Education: University of Jena
- Known for: Graph Theory: hypertrees, strongly chordal graphs
- Scientific career
- Fields: Mathematician
- Workplaces: University of Jena, University of Duisburg, University of Rostock
- Doctoral advisor: Gerd Wechsung

Andreas Brandstädt (born 17 January 1949 in Arnstadt, East Germany) is a German mathematician and computer scientist.

== Life and work ==
He graduated from the Friedrich Schiller University of Jena, Germany, with a Ph.D. (Dr. rer. nat.) in stochastics in 1976 and a habilitation (Dr. sc. nat.) in complexity theory in 1983. Since 1974 he worked there in the group of his academic teacher Gerd Wechsung.

From 1991 to 1994, he was the professor for Computer Science in the Department of Mathematics, at the University of Duisburg, Germany, and from 1994 to 2014 he was the professor for Theoretical Computer Science at the University of Rostock, Germany.

He was a visiting professor at the universities of Metz, Amiens, and Clermont-Ferrand (France) and at the University of Primorska in Koper (Slovenia). He was Invited Speaker at various conferences in Argentina, Austria, Belarus, Brasil, Canada, China, France, Greece, India, Israel, Norway, Poland, Slovenia, and Switzerland.

Brandstädt is an active researcher in graph algorithms, discrete mathematics, combinatorial optimization, and graph theory. A frequently used tool in his papers is tree structure of graphs and hypergraphs such as for hypertrees, strongly chordal graphs and chordal graphs.

He frequently took part in program committees such as Workshop on Graph-Theoretic Concepts in Computer Science (and four times was a co-organizer of this conference) and is member of the Editorial Board of Discrete Applied Mathematics.

== Selected bibliography ==
- Andreas Brandstädt, Graphen und Algorithmen, Teubner-Verlag, Stuttgart, 1994, ISBN 3-519-02131-5
- Andreas Brandstädt, Van Bang Le, and Jeremy P. Spinrad Graph Classes: A Survey, SIAM Monographs on Discrete Mathematics and Applications, Philadelphia, PA, 1999, second edition 2004 ISBN 0-89871-432-X
- Andreas Brandstädt, Van Bang Le, and Jeremy P. Spinrad Graph Classes: A Survey, SIAM Monographs on Discrete Mathematics and Applications, Philadelphia, PA, 1999, 2nd edition 2004 ISBN 0-89871-432-X
- Andreas Brandstädt, Feodor Dragan, Victor Chepoi, and Vitaly Voloshin, Dually chordal graphs, SIAM J. Discrete Math. Vol. 11, No. 3, pp. 437–455, 1998
- Andreas Brandstädt, Feodor Dragan, and Ekkehard Köhler, Linear time algorithms for Hamiltonian problems on (claw,net)-free graphs, SIAM J. Comput. Vol 30 No. 5, pp. 1662–1677, 2000
- Andreas Brandstädt, Van Bang Le, and R. Sritharan, Structure and linear-time recognition of 4-leaf powers, ACM Transactions on Algorithms Vol. 5, Issue 1, Article No. 11, 2008
- Andreas Brandstädt and Raffaele Mosca, Dominating Induced Matchings for P7-Free Graphs in Linear Time, Algorithmica Vol 68, pp. 998–1018, 2014
