= Sierpiński graph =

Sierpiński graphs (or Sierpiński networks) are a family of graphs defined by two parameters $n$ and $k$, denoted $S(n, k)$. These graphs have applications in topology, Tower of Hanoi problems, and interconnection networks for multiprocessor systems. The graphs are named after Wacław Sierpiński due to their connections with Sierpiński fractals.

== Definition ==
For any integers $n \geq 1$ and $k \geq 2$, the Sierpiński graph $S(n, k)$ is defined as follows:

- Vertices: The vertex set $V(S(n, k))$ consists of all $n$-tuples $(i_1, i_2, \ldots, i_n)$ where each $i_j \in \{1, 2, \ldots, k\}$. Thus $|V(S(n, k))| = k^n$.
- Edges: Two vertices $I = (i_1, i_2, \ldots, i_n)$ and $J = (j_1, j_2, \ldots, j_n)$ are adjacent if and only if there exists an $h \in \{1, 2, \ldots, n\}$ such that:
  - $i_t = j_t$ for all $t < h$
  - $i_h \neq j_h$
  - $i_t = j_h$ and $j_t = i_h$ for all $t > h$

== Properties ==
The number of vertices in $S(n, k)$ is $k^n$. The number of edges is $\frac{n k(k-1)}{2} k^{n-1}$.

The diameter of $S(n, k)$ is $2^n - 1$, and the chromatic number is $k$.

For $k \geq 3$, $S(n, k)$ is Hamiltonian and has a girth of 3.

== Relationship to Tower of Hanoi ==
Sierpiński graphs $S(n, k)$ are the state graphs for a variant of the Tower of Hanoi problem. In this variant, the vertices of $S(n, k)$ represent the $k^n$ possible arrangements of $n$ disks on $k$ pegs. An edge represents a legal move, which is defined as follows: for a move between peg $i$ and peg $j$, find the largest disk $h$ that is not on pegs $i$ or $j$. All disks smaller than $h$ must be on a single peg, and the move consists of transferring them between pegs $i$ and $j$.

Notably, for $k = 3$, the graph $S(n, 3)$ is isomorphic to the graph of the classical Tower of Hanoi with $n$ disks.

== Applications ==
=== Interconnection networks ===
Sierpiński graphs have been proposed as topologies for interconnection networks in computer architecture:

- They have a low and bounded degree, simplifying expansion and meeting VLSI pin constraints.
- The hierarchical structure matches traffic patterns in many parallel applications.
- They provide scalable costs and performance for future parallel computer systems and LANs.

=== Efficient dominating sets ===
Sierpiński graphs $S(n, k)$ possess essentially unique efficient dominating sets for all parameters $n$ and $k$, making them important examples in the study of domination in graphs. An efficient dominating set is also known as a 1-perfect code.

== Special cases ==
- $S(n, 1)$: The single vertex graph $K_1$
- $S(n, 2)$: The path graph $P_{2^n}$
- $S(1, k)$: The complete graph $K_k$
- $S(n, 3)$: Isomorphic to the Tower of Hanoi graph with $n$ disks

== See also ==
- Sierpiński triangle
- Tower of Hanoi
- Hanoi graph
- Interconnection network
- Topological index
