= Lusin space =

In mathematics, a Lusin space or Luzin space, named for N. N. Luzin, may mean:

- In general topology, Lusin space, image of a Polish space under a bijective continuous map
- In descriptive set theory and general topology, Luzin space or Luzin set, a hypothetical uncountable topological T_{1} space without isolated points in which every nowhere-dense subset is at most countable
