= Marcus O'Day =

American physicist

Marcus Driver O'Day (1897–1961) was an American physicist.

In 1918, he entered the military service in Eugene, Oregon after graduating from Centralia, Washington. He then attended the University of Oregon where he was assigned to the Students Army Training Corps, and was discharged at the end of the year.

Beginning in 1926 O'Day taught physics at Reed College. During World War II, he was employed at the MIT Radiation Laboratory where he worked on the radar IFF system.

In 1945 he joined the Air Force Cambridge Research Labs. In 1946 and 1947 he guided a team named the Blossom research group, that worked to launch scientific payloads into the ionosphere using V-2 rockets that had been brought to the United States from Germany following the war. He was also a member of the Rocket and Satellite Research Panel until it ceased operating in 1960.

He would theorize in 1958 that solar power could be used to sustain a colony on the Moon, and hypothesized that there may be water under the lunar surface.

The crater O'Day on the Moon is named after him, as is the "Marcus D. O'Day award".

== Bibliography ==
- M.D. O'Day and A.A. Knowlton, "Laboratory Manual in Physics", 1935, New York, McGraw-Hill.
- Marcus O'Day, Watson Laboratories, "Rocketbourne Upper Atmospheric Experiments of the Air Materiel Command", American Physical Society, SE Section, 1949.
