= O'Day (crater) =

Lunar impact crater

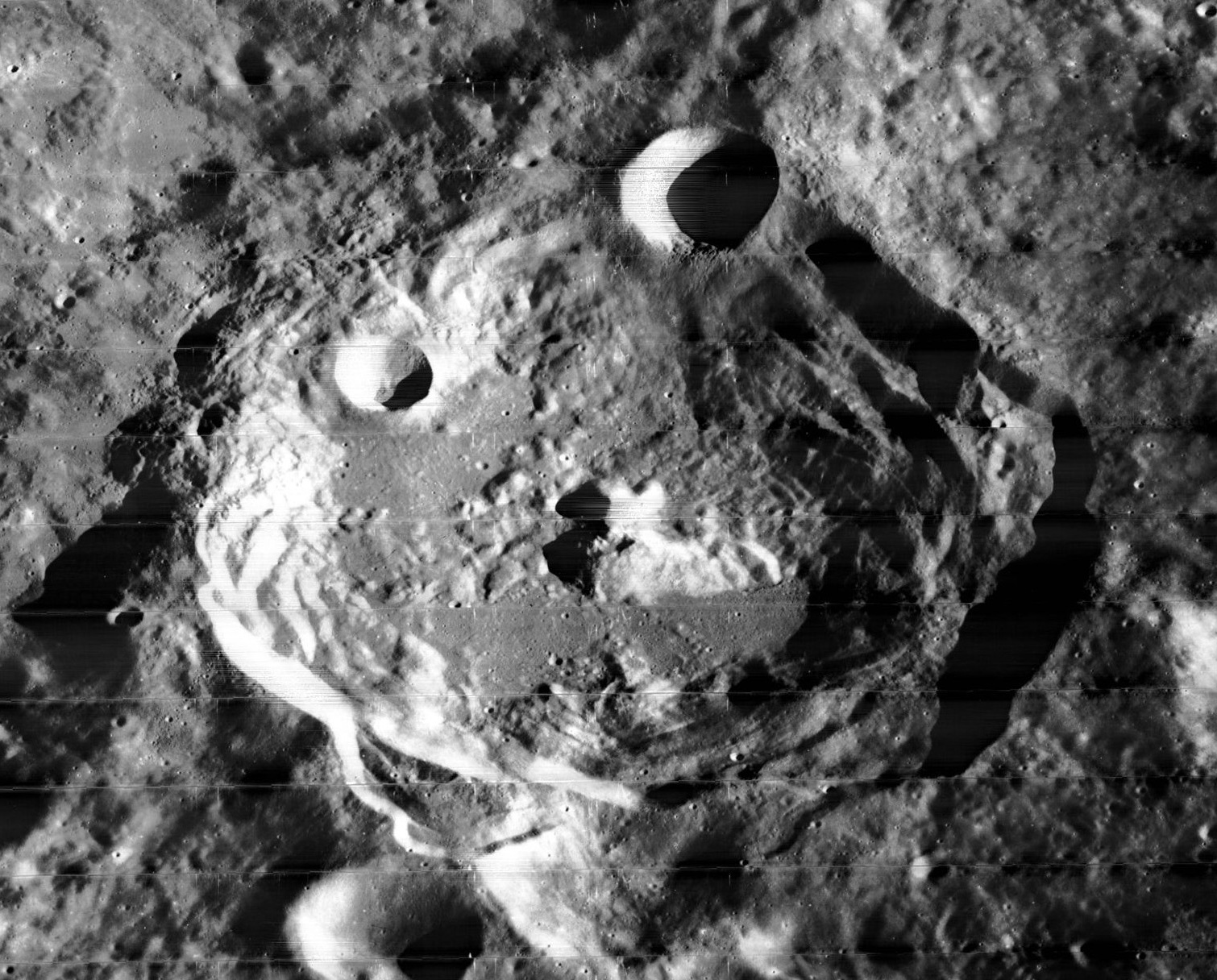
- Lunar Orbiter 2 image
- Coordinates: 30.6°S 157.5°E
- Diameter: 71 km
- Depth: Unknown
- Colongitude: 203° at sunrise
- Formation: Copernican
- Eponym: Marcus O'Day

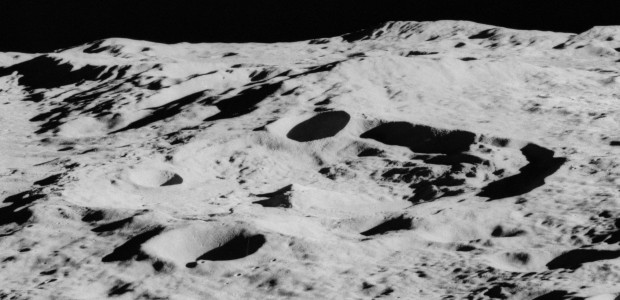
Oblique view from Apollo 17

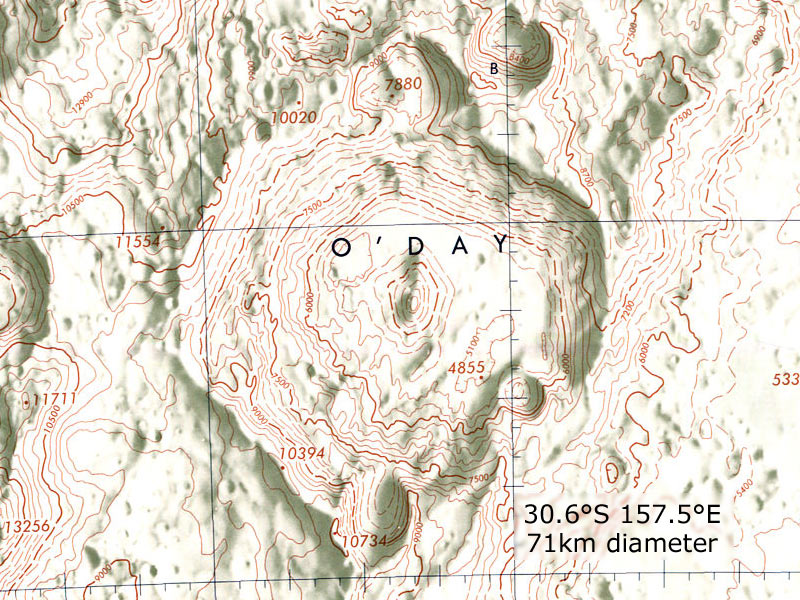
Map of O'Day crater

O'Day is a prominent lunar impact crater that is located on the far side of the Moon. It intrudes into the northwestern edge of Mare Ingenii, and the rim is lower on that side. To the northwest is the crater pair of Holetschek and Sierpinski. Southwest of O'Day lies the crater Seidel. It is named in honour of the American physicist Marcus O'Day.

Due to its prominent rays, O'Day is mapped as part of the Copernican System. The crater rim of O'Day remains sharp-edged, and the inner wall is terraced, especially in the northwestern half away from the mare. A small crater lies across the southern rim, and a tiny craterlet is located in the low inner rim between the crater and the mare. The floor is rough and irregular, with a double-peak at the midpoint. Anorthosite with a very low mafic abundance has been detected in this rise. The infrared spectrum of pure crystalline plagioclase has been identified on this central peak.

== Satellite craters ==
By convention these features are identified on lunar maps by placing the letter on the side of the crater midpoint that is closest to O'Day.

O'Day	Latitude	Longitude	Diameter
B	29.1° S	158.0° E	16 km
M	31.7° S	157.1° E	16 km
T	30.4° S	154.4° E	24 km
