= Seidel (crater) =

Lunar crater

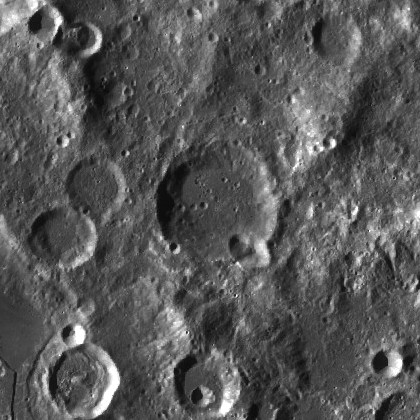
- Seidel at center
- Coordinates: 32.8°S 152.2°E
- Diameter: 62 km
- Depth: Unknown
- Colongitude: 202° at sunrise
- Eponym: Philipp L. von Seidel

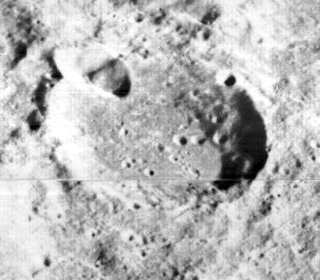
Oblique Lunar Orbiter 2 view, facing south

Seidel is a worn lunar impact crater that lies on the far side of the Moon, to the east-northeast of the much larger crater Jules Verne. Farther to the east of Seidel is the western edge of Mare Ingenii, and to the northeast lies the crater O'Day.

This is an eroded crater with a small crater overlying the south-southeastern outer rim. The southern rim is overlain by material deposits, most likely ejecta from another impact. The remainder of the rim has survived fairly well, and is marked only by tiny craterlets and general wear. The interior floor is relatively level with a few tiny craterlets marking the surface.

== Satellite craters ==
By convention these features are identified on lunar maps by placing the letter on the side of the crater midpoint that is closest to Seidel.

Seidel	Latitude	Longitude	Diameter
J	33.5° S	152.8° E	19 km
M	35.3° S	152.0° E	28 km
U	32.5° S	150.2° E	33 km
