= Pythagorean Triangles =

Book about right triangles by Wacław Sierpiński in 1954

- Author: Wacław Sierpiński
- Original title: Trójkąty pitagorejskie
- Translator: Ambikeshwar Sharma
- Language: Polish
- Genre: Mathematics
- Publication date: 1954
- Publication place: Poland

Pythagorean Triangles is a book on right triangles, the Pythagorean theorem, and Pythagorean triples. It was originally written in the Polish language by Wacław Sierpiński (titled Trójkąty pitagorejskie), and published in Warsaw in 1954. Indian mathematician Ambikeshwar Sharma translated it into English, with some added material from Sierpiński, and published it in the Scripta Mathematica Studies series of Yeshiva University (volume 9 of the series) in 1962. Dover Books republished the translation in a paperback edition in 2003. There is also a Russian translation of the 1954 edition.

== Topics ==
As a brief summary of the book's contents, reviewer Brian Hopkins quotes The Pirates of Penzance: "With many cheerful facts about the square of the hypotenuse."

The book is divided into 15 chapters (or 16, if one counts the added material as a separate chapter). The first three of these define the primitive Pythagorean triples (the ones in which the two sides and hypotenuse have no common factor), derive the standard formula for generating all primitive Pythagorean triples, compute the inradius of Pythagorean triangles, and construct all triangles with sides of length at most 100.

Chapter 4 considers special classes of Pythagorean triangles, including those with sides in arithmetic progression, nearly-isosceles triangles, and the relation between nearly-isosceles triangles and square triangular numbers. The next two chapters characterize the numbers that can appear in Pythagorean triples, and chapters 7–9 find sets of many Pythagorean triangles with the same side, the same hypotenuse, the same perimeter, the same area, or the same inradius.

Chapter 10 describes Pythagorean triangles with a side or area that is a square or cube, connecting this problem to Fermat's Last Theorem. After a chapter on Heronian triangles, Chapter 12 returns to this theme, discussing triangles whose hypotenuse and sum of sides are squares. Chapter 13 relates Pythagorean triangles to rational points on a unit circle, Chapter 14 discusses right triangles whose sides are unit fractions rather than integers, and Chapter 15 is about the Euler brick problem, a three-dimensional generalization of Pythagorean triangles, and related problems on integer-sided tetrahedra. Sadly, in giving an example of a Heronian tetrahedron found by E. P. Starke, the book repeats a mistake of Starke in calculating its volume.

== Audience and reception ==
The book is aimed at mathematics teachers, in order to inspire their interest in this subject, despite complaining that some of its proofs are overly complicated, reviewer Donald Vestal also suggests this as a "fun book for a mostly general audience".

Reviewer Brian Hopkins suggests that some of the book's material could be simplified using modular notation and linear algebra, and that the book could benefit by updating it to include a bibliography, index, more than its one illustration, and pointers to recent research in this area such as the Boolean Pythagorean triples problem. Nevertheless, he highly recommends it to mathematics teachers and readers interested in "thorough and elegant proofs". Reviewer Eric Stephen Barnes rates Sharma's translation as "very readable". The editors of zbMATH write of the Dover edition that "It is a pleasure to have this classic text available again".
