= Roman dominating set =

Type of dominating set in graph theory

An assignment of the weights 0, 1 or 2 to each vertex such that each vertex with weight 0 is adjacent to at least one vertex of weight 2 is called a Roman dominating function.

In graph theory, a Roman dominating set (RDS) is a special type of dominating set inspired by historical military defense strategies of the Roman Empire. The concept models a scenario where cities (vertices) can be defended by legions stationed either within the city or in neighboring cities. A city is considered secure if it either has at least one legion stationed there, or if it has no legions but is adjacent to a city that has at least two legions, allowing one legion to be sent for defense while leaving the original city still protected.

The Roman domination number of a graph measures the minimum total number of legions needed to protect all cities according to this strategy.

== Definition ==
Let $G = (V, E)$ be a graph. A Roman dominating function (RDF) is a function $f : V \to \{0, 1, 2\}$ such that for every vertex $v$ with $f(v) = 0$, there exists a vertex $u$ adjacent to $v$ with $f(u) = 2$.

The weight of a Roman dominating function $f$ is $w(f) = \sum_{v \in V} f(v)$. The Roman domination number $\gamma_R(G)$ is the minimum weight among all Roman dominating functions for $G$.

Equivalently, let $(V_0, V_1, V_2)$ be an ordered partition of $V$ where $V_i = \{v \in V : f(v) = i\}$. Then $f$ is a Roman dominating function if and only if every vertex in $V_0$ is adjacent to at least one vertex in $V_2$.

== Examples ==
For the complete graph $K_n$ with $n \geq 2$, $\gamma_R(K_n) = 2$, achieved by assigning 2 to any single vertex and 0 to all others.

For the path graph $P_n$ and cycle graph $C_n$, $\gamma_R(P_n) = \gamma_R(C_n) = \lceil 2n/3 \rceil$.

For the empty graph $\overline{K}_n$, $\gamma_R(\overline{K}_n) = n$, since each vertex must be assigned at least 1.

For the complete n-partite graph $K_{m_1, m_2, \dots, m_n}$ with partition sizes $m_1 \le m_2 \le \dots \le m_n$:

- $\gamma_R(K_{m_1, \dots, m_n}) = 2$ if $m_1 = 1$.
- $\gamma_R(K_{m_1, \dots, m_n}) = 3$ if $m_1 = 2$.
- $\gamma_R(K_{m_1, \dots, m_n}) = 4$ if $m_1 \ge 3$.

== Basic properties ==
Several properties of Roman domination were established by Cockayne et al.:

- For any graph $G$, $\gamma(G) \leq \gamma_R(G) \leq 2\gamma(G)$, where $\gamma(G)$ is the domination number.
- $\gamma(G) = \gamma_R(G)$ if and only if $G$ is the empty graph.
- If $G$ has a vertex of degree $n - 1$, then $\gamma_R(G) = 2$.
- For any Roman dominating function $f = (V_0, V_1, V_2)$:
  - The subgraph induced by $V_1$ has maximum degree at most 1.
  - No edge joins $V_1$ and $V_2$.
  - Each vertex in $V_0$ is adjacent to at most two vertices in $V_1$.
  - $V_2$ is a dominating set for the subgraph induced by $V_0 \cup V_2$.

A graph $G$ is called a Roman graph if $\gamma_R(G) = 2\gamma(G)$. This occurs if and only if $G$ has a Roman dominating function of minimum weight with $V_1 = \emptyset$.

== Roman domination value ==
The Roman domination value of a vertex extends the concept of Roman domination by considering how many minimum Roman dominating functions assign positive values to that vertex.

For a graph $G$, let $F$ be the set of all $\gamma_R(G)$-functions (Roman dominating functions of minimum weight). For a vertex $v \in V$, the Roman domination value $R_G(v)$ is defined as:

$$R_G(v) = \sum_{f \in F} f(v)$$

Some basic properties of Roman domination value are known:

- $0 \leq R_G(v) \leq 2\tau_R(G)$, where $\tau_R(G)$ is the number of $\gamma_R(G)$-functions
- $\sum_{v \in V(G)} R_G(v) = \tau_R(G)\gamma_R(G)$
- If there is a graph isomorphism mapping vertex $v$ in $G$ to vertex $v'$ in $G'$, then $R_G(v) = R_{G'}(v')$

== Extremal problems ==
Several extremal results have been established for Roman domination numbers.

For any connected $n$-vertex graph $G$ with $n \geq 3$, $\gamma_R(G) \leq 4n/5$. Equality holds if and only if $G$ is $C_5$ or obtained from $n/5$ copies of $P_5$ by adding a connected subgraph on the set of centers.

For any $n$-vertex graph $G$ with $n \geq 3$, $5 \leq \gamma_R(G) + \gamma_R(\overline{G}) \leq n + 3$.

For any $n$-vertex graph $G$ with $n \geq 160$, $\gamma_R(G)\gamma_R(\overline{G}) \leq 16n/5$.

If $G$ is a connected $n$-vertex graph with $\delta(G) \geq 2$ and $n \geq 9$, then $\gamma_R(G) \leq 8n/11$.

== Algorithms and complexity ==
The decision problem for Roman domination is NP-complete, even when restricted to bipartite, chordal, or planar graphs. However, polynomial-time algorithms exist for computing the Roman domination number on interval graphs, cographs, and strongly chordal graphs.

== See also ==
- Dominating set
- Graph labeling
