= Luzin space =

In mathematics, a Luzin space (or Lusin space), named for N. N. Luzin, is an uncountable topological T_{1} space without isolated points in which every nowhere-dense subset is countable. There are many minor variations of this definition in use: the T_{1} condition can be replaced by T_{2} or T_{3}, and some authors allow a countable or even arbitrary number of isolated points.

The existence of a Luzin space is independent of the axioms of ZFC. Lusin (1914) showed that the continuum hypothesis implies that a Luzin space exists. Kunen (1977) showed that assuming Martin's axiom and the negation of the continuum hypothesis, there are no Hausdorff Luzin spaces.

== In real analysis ==
In real analysis and descriptive set theory, a Luzin set (or Lusin set), is defined as an uncountable subset A of the reals $\R$ such that every uncountable subset of A is nonmeager (that is, of the second Baire category) in $\R.$ Equivalently, A is an uncountable subset of $\R$ that meets every meager subset of $\R$ (i.e., first category set) in only countably many points. Equivalently, A is an uncountable subset of $\R$ that meets every nowhere dense subset of $\R$ (i.e., first category set) in only countably many points.

Luzin proved that, if the continuum hypothesis holds, then every nonmeager set in $\R$ has a Luzin subset. Obvious properties of a Luzin set are that it must be nonmeager (otherwise the set itself is an uncountable meager subset) and of measure zero, because every set of positive measure contains a meager set that also has positive measure, and is therefore uncountable.

A weakly Luzin set is an uncountable subset of a real vector space such that for any uncountable subset the set of directions between different elements of the subset is dense in the sphere of directions.

The measure-category duality provides a measure analogue of Luzin sets – sets of positive outer measure, every uncountable subset of which has positive outer measure. These sets are called Sierpiński sets, after Wacław Sierpiński. Sierpiński sets are weakly Luzin sets but are not Luzin sets.

== Example of a Luzin set ==
Choose a collection of 2^{ℵ_{0}} meager subsets of R such that every meager subset is contained in one of them. By the continuum hypothesis, it is possible to enumerate them as S_{α} for countable ordinals α. For each countable ordinal β choose a real number x_{β} that is not in any of the sets S_{α} for α<β, which is possible as the union of these sets is meager so is not the whole of R. Then the uncountable set X of all these real numbers x_{β} has only a countable number of elements in each set S_{α}, so is a Luzin set.

More complicated variations of this construction produce examples of Luzin sets that are subgroups, subfields or real-closed subfields of the real numbers.
