= Hypertree =

Generalization of tree graphs to hypergraphs

A hypertree (blue vertices and yellow hyperedges) and its host tree (red)

In the mathematical field of graph theory, a hypergraph H is called a hypertree if it admits a host graph T such that T is a tree. In other words, H is a hypertree if there exists a tree T such that every hyperedge of H is the set of vertices of a connected subtree of T. Hypertrees have also been called arboreal hypergraphs or tree hypergraphs.

Every tree T is itself a hypertree: T itself can be used as the host graph, and every edge of T is a subtree of this host graph. Therefore, hypertrees may be seen as a generalization of the notion of a tree for hypergraphs. They include the connected Berge-acyclic hypergraphs, which have also been used as a (different) generalization of trees for hypergraphs.

== Properties ==
Every hypertree has the Helly property (2-Helly property): if a subset S of its hyperedges has the property that every two hyperedges in S have a nonempty intersection, then S itself has a nonempty intersection (a vertex that belongs to all hyperedges in S).

By results of Duchet, Flament and Slater hypertrees may be equivalently characterized in the following ways.

- A hypergraph H is a hypertree if and only if it has the Helly property and its line graph is a chordal graph.
- A hypergraph H is a hypertree if and only if its dual hypergraph H^{*} is conformal and the 2-section graph of H^{*} is chordal.
- A hypergraph is a hypertree if and only if its dual hypergraph is alpha-acyclic in the sense of Fagin.

It is possible to recognize hypertrees (as duals of alpha-acyclic hypergraphs) in linear time. The exact cover problem (finding a set of non-overlapping hyperedges that covers all the vertices) is solvable in polynomial time for hypertrees but remains NP-complete for alpha-acyclic hypergraphs.

== See also ==
- Dually chordal graph, a graph whose maximal cliques form a hypertree
