= Sierpinski (crater) =

Crater on the Moon

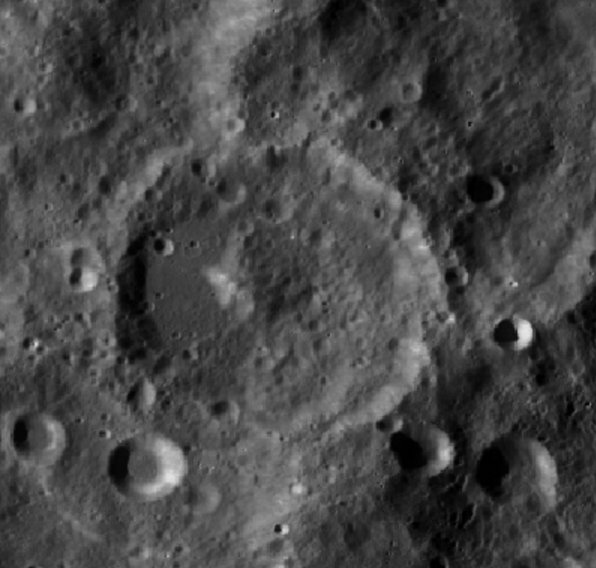
- LRO image
- Coordinates: 27.2°S 154.5°E
- Diameter: 69 km
- Depth: Unknown
- Colongitude: 206° at sunrise
- Formation: Nectarian
- Eponym: Wacław F. Sierpiński

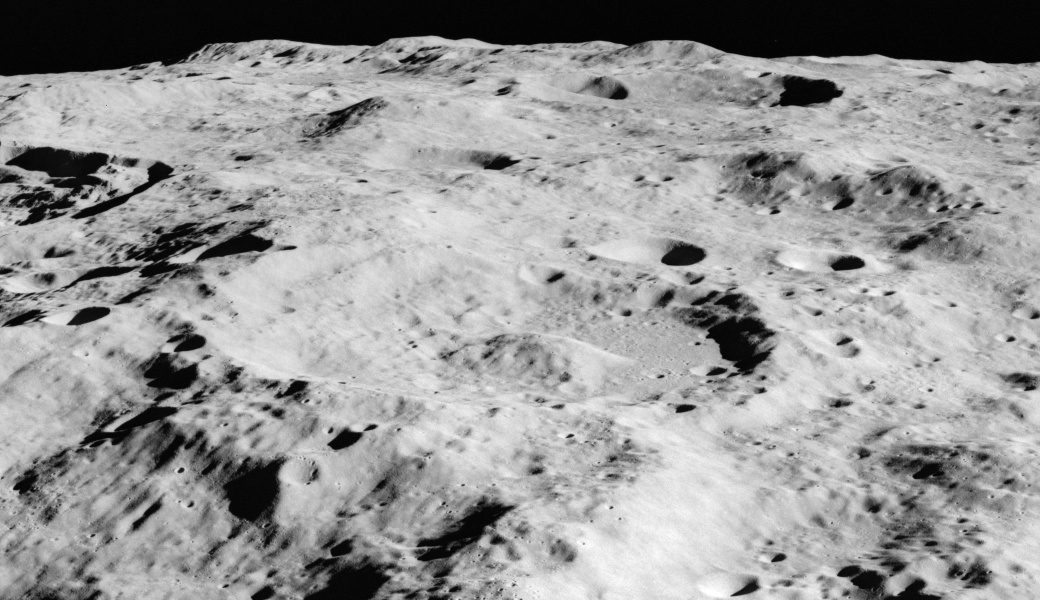
Oblique view facing south from Apollo 17

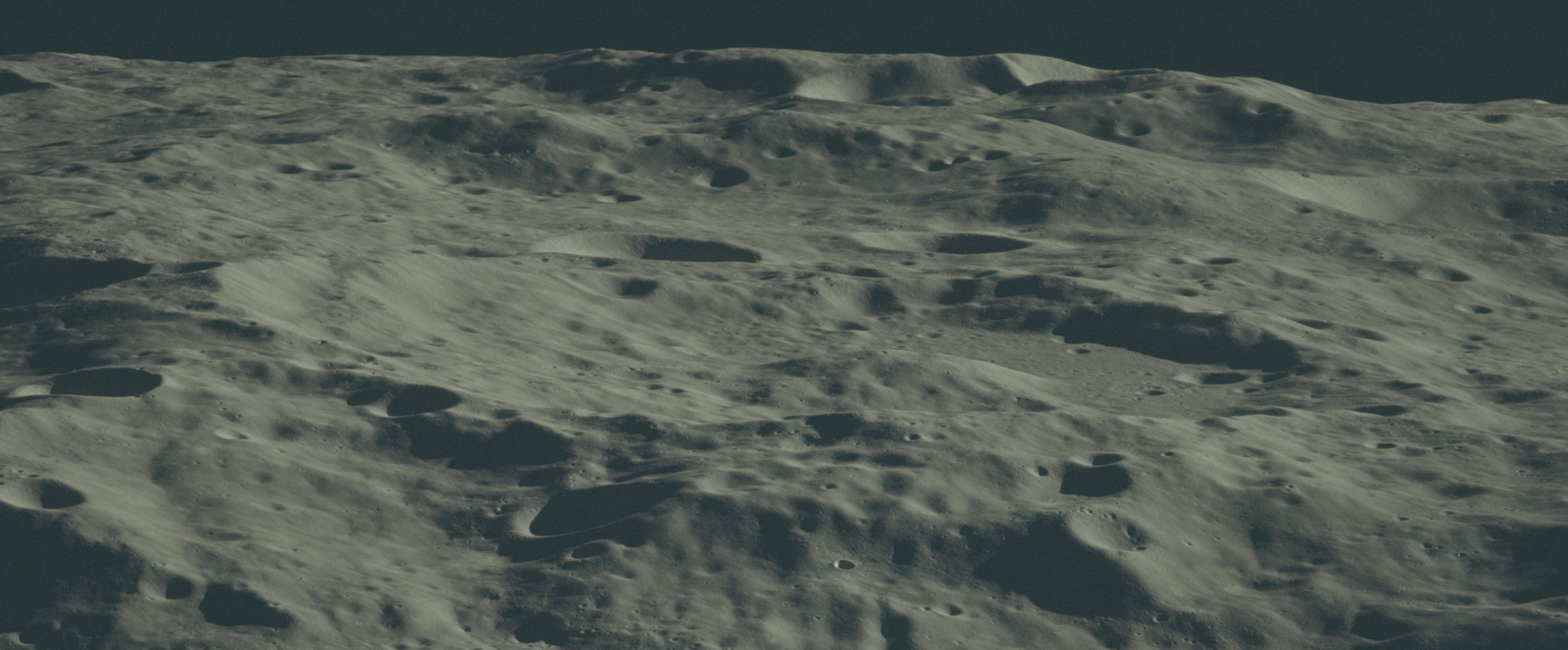
Another view from Apollo 17

Sierpinski is a lunar impact crater on the far side of the Moon. It lies to the southeast of the huge walled plain called Gagarin, and to the northwest of the crater O'Day and the Mare Ingenii.

On the lunar geologic timescale, Sierpinski dates to the Nectarian period. This crater has undergone some wear, particularly along the southwest where Sierpinski Q intrudes slightly into the inner wall. The rim is higher and the inner wall wider along the eastern side. There is a prominent ridge within the interior that extends from near the midpoint to the northern inner wall. There are several small craters along the inner wall in the north and northwest. Only a small portion of the interior floor along the western half is relatively level.

== Satellite craters ==
By convention these features are identified on lunar maps by placing the letter on the side of the crater midpoint that is closest to Sierpinski.

Sierpinski	Latitude	Longitude	Diameter
Q	28.3° S	153.6° E	15 km
