= Edge dominating set =

Subset of a graph's edges such that all other edges are adjacent to at least one

Examples of edge dominating sets.

In graph theory, an edge dominating set for a graph G = (V, E) is a subset D ⊆ E such that every edge not in D is adjacent to at least one edge in D. An edge dominating set is also known as a line dominating set. Figures (a)–(d) are examples of edge dominating sets (thick red lines).

A minimum edge dominating set is a smallest edge dominating set. Figures (a) and (b) are examples of minimum edge dominating sets (it can be checked that there is no edge dominating set of size 2 for this graph).

== Properties ==
An edge dominating set for G is a dominating set for its line graph L(G) and vice versa.

Any maximal matching is always an edge dominating set. Figures (b) and (d) are examples of maximal matchings.

Furthermore, the size of a minimum edge dominating set equals the size of a minimum maximal matching. A minimum maximal matching is a minimum edge dominating set; Figure (b) is an example of a minimum maximal matching. A minimum edge dominating set is not necessarily a minimum maximal matching, as illustrated in Figure (a); however, given a minimum edge dominating set D, it is easy to find a minimum maximal matching with |D| edges (see, e.g., Yannakakis & Gavril 1980).

== Algorithms and computational complexity ==
Determining whether there is an edge dominating set of a given size for a given graph is an NP-complete problem (and therefore finding a minimum edge dominating set is an NP-hard problem). Yannakakis & Gavril (1980) show that the problem is NP-complete even in the case of a bipartite graph with maximum degree 3, and also in the case of a planar graph with maximum degree 3.

There is a simple polynomial-time approximation algorithm with approximation factor 2: find any maximal matching. A maximal matching is an edge dominating set; furthermore, a maximal matching M can be at worst 2 times as large as a smallest maximal matching, and a smallest maximal matching has the same size as the smallest edge dominating set.

Also the edge-weighted version of the problem can be approximated within factor 2, but the algorithm is considerably more complicated (Fujito & Nagamochi 2002; Parekh 2002).

Chlebík & Chlebíková (2006) show that finding a better than (7/6)-approximation is NP-hard. Schmied & Viehmann proved that the Problem is UGC-hard to approximate to within any constant better than 3/2.
