= Sierpiński set =

In mathematics, a Sierpiński set is an uncountable subset of a real vector space whose intersection with every measure-zero set is countable. The existence of Sierpiński sets is independent of the axioms of ZFC. Sierpiński (1924) showed that they exist if the continuum hypothesis is true. On the other hand, they do not exist if Martin's axiom for ℵ_{1} is true. Sierpiński sets are weakly Luzin sets but are not Luzin sets (Kunen 2011, p. 376).

== Example of a Sierpiński set ==
Choose a collection of 2^{ℵ_{0}} measure-0 subsets of R such that every measure-0 subset is contained in one of them. By the continuum hypothesis, it is possible to enumerate them as S_{α} for countable ordinals α. For each countable ordinal β choose a real number x_{β} that is not in any of the sets S_{α} for α < β, which is possible as the union of these sets has measure 0 so is not the whole of R. Then the uncountable set X of all these real numbers x_{β} has only a countable number of elements in each set S_{α}, so is a Sierpiński set.

It is possible for a Sierpiński set to be a subgroup under addition. For this one modifies the construction above by choosing a real number x_{β} that is not in any of the countable number of sets of the form (S_{α} + X)/n for α < β, where n is a positive integer and X is an integral linear combination of the numbers x_{α} for α < β. Then the group generated by these numbers is a Sierpiński set and a group under addition. More complicated variations of this construction produce examples of Sierpiński sets that are subfields or real-closed subfields of the real numbers.
