= Support vertex =

Vertex adjacent to a leaf

Each blue vertex in the graph shown is a support vertex, adjacent to at least one leaf (highlighted green). The darker blue vertex is a strong support vertex, and the two lighter blue vertices are weak support vertices.

In graph theory, a support vertex is a vertex that is adjacent to a leaf (a vertex of degree one). Support vertices play an important role in the study of domination in graphs, since every support vertex must belong to every minimum dominating set.

== Definition ==
Let $G = (V, E)$ be a graph. A vertex $v \in V$ is called a support vertex if $v$ is adjacent to at least one leaf of $G$.

A support vertex is called a weak support vertex if it is adjacent to exactly one leaf, and a strong support vertex if it is adjacent to two or more leaves.

== Properties ==
- Every support vertex belongs to every minimum dominating set of a graph.
- If a graph has no weak support vertex, then its domination number equals its certified domination number.
- Every support vertex belongs to every minimum certified dominating set of a graph.
- A tree $T$ of order $n$ has a perfect matching if and only if $\gamma_t^{\text{gr}}(T) = n$, where $\gamma_t^{\text{gr}}$ denotes the Grundy total domination number. The characterization of trees achieving the lower bound for this parameter involves the structure of support vertices: among trees with no strong support vertex, the bound $\gamma_t^{\text{gr}}(T) \geq \tfrac{2}{3}(n + 1)$ holds.

== See also ==
- Leaf (graph theory)
- Dominating set
