= Corona product =

The corona product $G \circ H$ of K_{6} and C_{4}.

In graph theory, the corona product of graphs G and H, denoted $G \circ H$, can be obtained by taking one copy of G, called the center graph, and a number of copies of H equal to the order of G. Then, each copy of H is assigned a vertex in G, and that one vertex is attached to each vertex in its corresponding H copy by an edge.

The star edge coloring of a graph G is a proper edge coloring without bichromatic paths and cycles of length four, similar to the star coloring of a graph, but coloring the edges instead of the vertices. The star edge chromatic index $\chi'_{st}(G)$ of the corona product of a path graph with cycle, wheel, helm and gear graphs are known.

== Applications ==
Corona products have applications in mathematical chemistry and the study of molecular graphs. In chemistry, molecules and molecular compounds are modeled as graphs where vertices represent atoms and edges represent chemical bonds. Corona product operations can be used to construct chemically interesting molecular graphs from simpler component graphs.

Topological indices are numerical graph invariants used to predict physico-chemical properties and biological activities of chemical compounds through quantitative structure–activity relationship (QSAR) and quantitative structure–property relationship (QSPR) studies. Various eccentricity-based topological indices of corona product graphs, including the total eccentricity index, eccentric connectivity index, and modified eccentric connectivity index, have been studied for molecular graph applications.

== See also ==
- Graph operations
- Graph product
