= Wacław Sierpiński =

Polish mathematician (1882–1969)

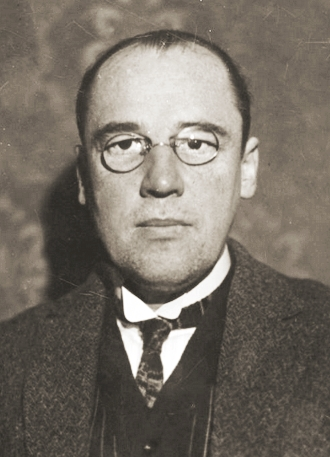
- Sierpiński in 1928
- Born: Wacław Franciszek Sierpiński; 14 March 1882; Warsaw, Congress Poland, Russian Empire
- Died: 21 October 1969 (aged 87); Warsaw, Polish People's Republic
- Citizenship: Polish
- Education: University of Warsaw
- Known for: Sierpiński triangle Sierpiński carpet Sierpiński curve Sierpiński number Sierpiński cube Sierpiński's constant Sierpiński set Sierpiński game Sierpiński space
- Scientific career
- Fields: Mathematics
- Doctoral advisor: Stanisław Zaremba; Georgy Voronoy
- Doctoral students: Jerzy Browkin; Edward Marczewski; Stefan Mazurkiewicz; Jerzy Neyman; Stanisław Ruziewicz; Andrzej Schinzel

Wacław Franciszek Sierpiński (Polish: [ˈvat͡swaf fraɲˈt͡ɕiʂɛk ɕɛrˈpij̃skʲi]; 14 March 1882 – 21 October 1969) was a Polish mathematician. He was known for contributions to set theory (research on the axiom of choice and the continuum hypothesis), number theory, theory of functions, and topology. He published over 700 papers and 50 books.

Three well-known fractals are named after him (the Sierpiński triangle, the Sierpiński carpet, and the Sierpiński curve), as are Sierpiński numbers and the associated Sierpiński problem.

== Early life and education ==
Sierpiński was born in 1882 in Warsaw, Congress Poland, to a doctor father Konstanty and mother Ludwika (née Łapińska). His abilities in mathematics were evident from childhood. He enrolled in the Department of Mathematics and Physics at the University of Warsaw in 1899 and graduated five years later.

In 1903, while still at the University of Warsaw, the Department of Mathematics and Physics offered a prize for the best essay from a student on Voronoy's contribution to number theory. Sierpiński was awarded a gold medal for his essay, thus laying the foundation for his first major mathematical contribution. Unwilling for his work to be published in Russian, he withheld it until 1907, when it was published in Samuel Dickstein's mathematical magazine 'Prace Matematyczno-Fizyczne' (Polish: 'The Works of Mathematics and Physics').

After his graduation in 1904, Sierpiński worked as a school teacher of mathematics and physics in Warsaw. However, when the school closed because of a strike, Sierpiński decided to go to Kraków to pursue a doctorate. At the Jagiellonian University in Kraków, he attended lectures by Stanisław Zaremba on mathematics. He also studied astronomy and philosophy. In 1906, he received his doctorate and in 1908 was appointed to the University of Lwów. In 1910, he became head of the Faculty of Mathematics at the university.

== Career ==
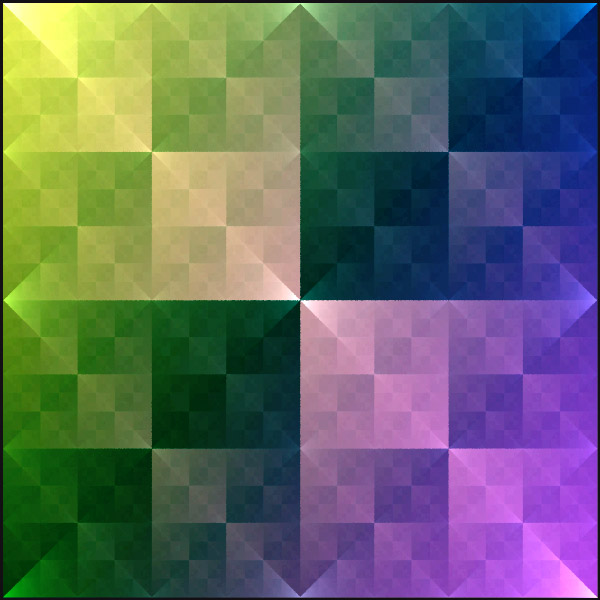
Sierpinski square, a fractal

In 1907 Sierpiński first became interested in set theory when he came across a theorem which stated that points in the plane could be specified with a single coordinate. He wrote to Tadeusz Banachiewicz (then at Göttingen), asking how such a result was possible. He received the one-word reply 'Cantor'. Sierpiński began to study set theory and, in 1909, he gave the first ever lecture course devoted entirely to the subject.

Sierpiński maintained an output of research papers and books. During the years 1908 to 1914, when he taught at the University of Lwów, he published three books in addition to many research papers. These books were The Theory of Irrational Numbers (1910), Outline of Set Theory (1912), and The Theory of Numbers (1912).

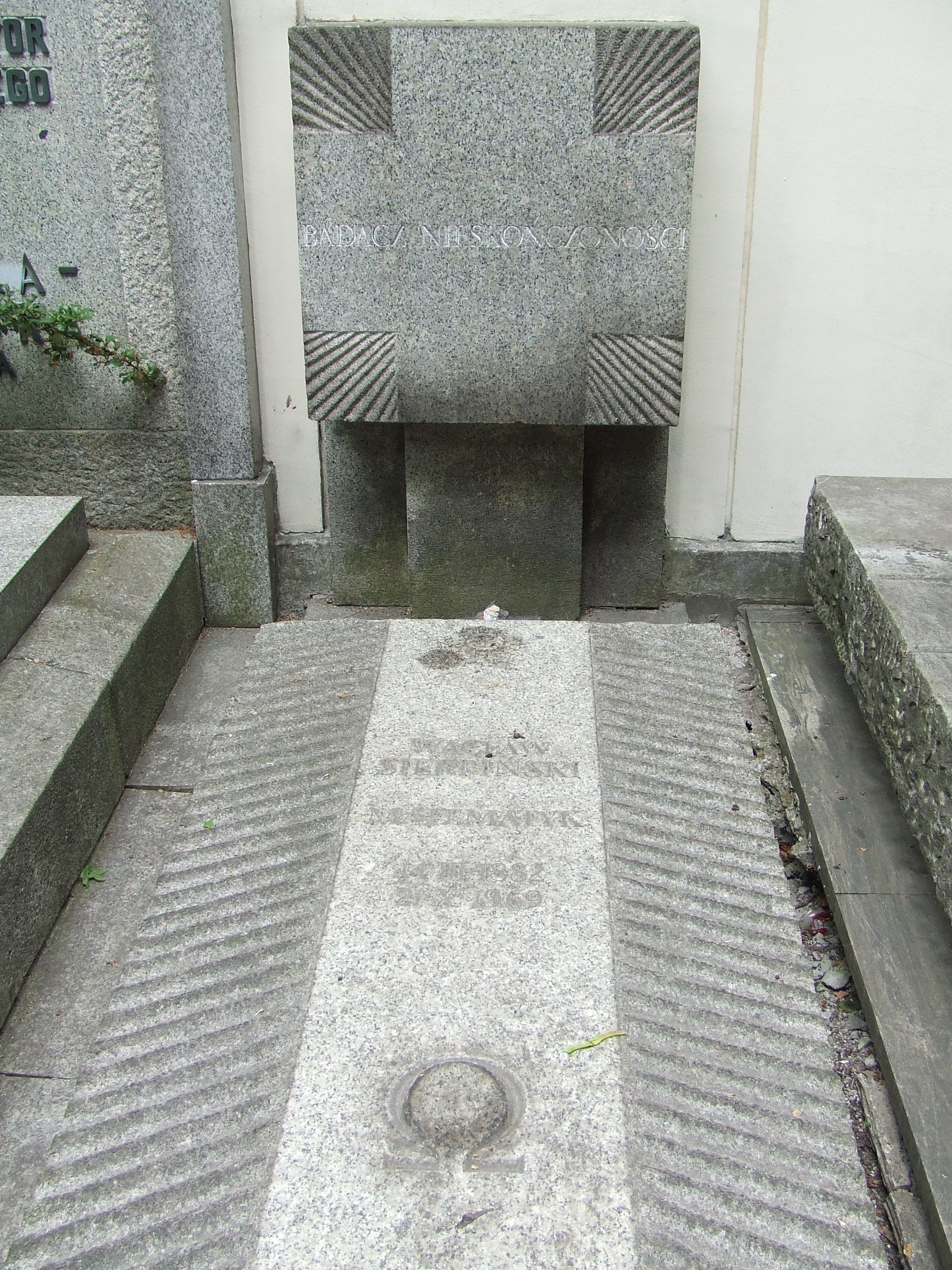
Grave of Wacław Sierpiński

When World War I began in 1914, Sierpiński and his family were in Russia. To avoid the persecution that was common for Polish foreigners, Sierpiński spent the rest of the war years in Moscow working with Nikolai Luzin. Together they began the study of analytic sets. In 1916, Sierpiński gave the first example of an absolutely normal number.

When World War I ended in 1918, Sierpiński returned to Lwów. However shortly after taking up his appointment again in Lwów he was offered a post at the University of Warsaw, which he accepted. In 1919 he was promoted to a professor. He spent the rest of his life in Warsaw.

During the Polish–Soviet War (1919–1921), Sierpiński helped break Soviet Russian ciphers for the Polish General Staff's cryptologic agency.

In 1920, Sierpiński, together with Zygmunt Janiszewski and his former student Stefan Mazurkiewicz, founded the mathematical journal Fundamenta Mathematicae. Sierpiński edited the journal, which specialized in papers on set theory.

During this period, Sierpiński worked predominantly on set theory, but also on point set topology and functions of a real variable. In set theory he made contributions on the axiom of choice and on the continuum hypothesis. He proved that Zermelo–Fraenkel set theory together with the Generalized continuum hypothesis imply the Axiom of choice. He also worked on what is now known as the Sierpiński curve. Sierpiński continued to collaborate with Luzin on investigations of analytic and projective sets. His work on functions of a real variable includes results on functional series, differentiability of functions and Baire's classification.

Sierpiński worked at the State Institute of Mathematics, which was incorporated into the Polish Academy of Sciences in 1952. He retired in 1960 as professor at the University of Warsaw, but continued until 1967 to give a seminar on the Theory of Numbers at the Polish Academy of Sciences. He also continued editorial work as editor-in-chief of Acta Arithmetica, and as a member of the editorial board of Rendiconti del Circolo Matematico di Palermo, Composito Matematica, and Zentralblatt für Mathematik.

In 1964 he was one of the signatories of the so-called Letter of 34 to Prime Minister Józef Cyrankiewicz regarding freedom of culture.

Sierpiński is interred at the Powązki Cemetery in Warsaw, Poland.

== Honors received ==
Honorary Degrees: Lwów (1929), St. Marks of Lima (1930), Tartu (1932), Amsterdam (1932), Sofia (1939), Paris (1939), Bordeaux (1947), Prague (1948), Wrocław (1948), Lucknow (1949), and Moscow (1967).

For high involvement with the development of mathematics in Poland, Sierpiński was honored with election to the Polish Academy of Learning in 1921 and that same year was made dean of the faculty at the University of Warsaw. In 1928, he became vice-chairman of the Warsaw Scientific Society, and that same year was elected chairman of the Polish Mathematical Society.

He was elected to the Geographic Society of Lima (1931), Royal Scientific Society of Liège (1934), Bulgarian Academy of Sciences (1936), National Academy of Lima (1939), Royal Society of Sciences of Naples (1939), Accademia dei Lincei of Rome (1947), Germany Academy of Sciences (1950), American Academy of Arts and Sciences (1959), Paris Academy (1960), Royal Dutch Academy (1961), Academy of Science of Brussels (1961), London Mathematical Society (1964), Romanian Academy (1965) and Papal Academy of Sciences (1967).

In 1946, he received the Stefan Banach Prize of the Polish Mathematical Society. In 1949, Sierpiński was awarded Poland's Scientific Prize, first degree.

In 1974, the Polish Mathematical Society and the University of Warsaw jointly established the Sierpiński Medal, an annual award presented for outstanding scientific contributions by mathematicians with connections to Poland.

In 1982, the Polish Post issued a 6-złoty commemorative stamp featuring Sierpiński as part of the "Polish Mathematicians" series.

In 2014, a sculpture in the form of a tree inspired by a fractal created by Sierpiński was unveiled at the Wallenberg Square in Stockholm as part of an exhibition organized by the Polish Ministry of Foreign Affairs on the 10th anniversary of Poland joining the European Union and 15th anniversary of Poland joining NATO.

== Publications ==
Sierpiński authored 724 papers and 50 books, almost all in Polish. His book Cardinal and Ordinal Numbers was originally published in English in 1958. Two books, Introduction to General Topology (1934) and General Topology (1952) were translated into English by Canadian mathematician Cecilia Krieger. Another book, Pythagorean Triangles (1954), was translated into English by Indian mathematician Ambikeshwar Sharma, published in 1962, and republished by Dover Books in 2003; it also has a Russian translation. Another work of his published in English is the Elementary Theory of Numbers (translated by A. Hulanicki in 1964), based on his Polish Teoria Liczb (1914 and 1959). Another book, named "250 Problems in Elementary Number Theory" was translated into English (1970) and Russian (1968).

== See also ==
- List of Polish mathematicians
- List of things named after Wacław Sierpiński
- Menger sponge
- Seventeen or Bust
- The Sierpiński Moon crater
- Timeline of Polish science and technology
