= Sierpiński triangle =

Fractal composed of triangles

Sierpiński triangle

Generated using a random algorithm

Sierpiński triangle in logic: The first 16 conjunctions of lexicographically ordered arguments. The columns interpreted as binary numbers give 1, 3, 5, 15, 17, 51... (sequence A001317 in the OEIS)

The Sierpiński triangle, also called the Sierpiński gasket or Sierpiński sieve, is a fractal with the overall shape of an equilateral triangle, subdivided recursively into smaller equilateral triangles. Originally constructed as a Sierpiński curve, this is one of the basic examples of self-similar sets—that is, it is a mathematically generated pattern reproducible at any magnification or reduction. It is named after the Polish mathematician Wacław Sierpiński but appeared as a decorative pattern many centuries before the work of Sierpiński.

== Constructions ==
There are many different ways of constructing the Sierpiński triangle.

=== Removing triangles ===
The Sierpiński triangle may be constructed from an equilateral triangle by repeated removal of triangular subsets:

1. Start with an equilateral triangle.
2. Subdivide it into four smaller congruent equilateral triangles and remove the central triangle.
3. Repeat step 2 with each of the remaining smaller triangles infinitely.

The iterations of the Sierpiński triangle

Each removed triangle (a trema) is topologically an open set. This process of recursively removing triangles is an example of a finite subdivision rule.

=== Shrinking and duplication ===
The same sequence of shapes, converging to the Sierpiński triangle, can alternatively be generated by the following steps:

1. Start with any triangle in a plane (any closed, bounded region in the plane will actually work). The canonical Sierpiński triangle uses an equilateral triangle with a base parallel to the horizontal axis (first image).
2. Shrink the triangle to 1/2 height and 1/2 width, make three copies, and position the three shrunken triangles so that each triangle touches the two other triangles at a corner (image 2). Note the emergence of the central hole—because the three shrunken triangles can between them cover only 3/4 of the area of the original. (Holes are an important feature of Sierpiński's triangle.)
3. Repeat step 2 with each of the smaller triangles (image 3 and so on).

This infinite process is not dependent upon the starting shape being a triangle—it is just clearer that way. The first few steps starting, for example, from a square also tend towards a Sierpiński triangle (as illustrated below), and Michael Barnsley used an image of a fish to illustrate this in his paper "V-variable fractals and superfractals."

Iterating from a square

The actual fractal is what would be obtained after an infinite number of iterations. More formally, one describes it in terms of functions on closed sets of points. If we let d_{A} denote the dilation by a factor of 1/2 about a point A, then the Sierpiński triangle with corners A, B, and C is the fixed set of the transformation $d_\mathrm{A} \cup d_\mathrm{B} \cup d_\mathrm{C}$.

This is an attractive fixed set, so that when the operation is applied to any other compact set repeatedly, the images converge (in Hausdorff metric) to the Sierpiński triangle. This is what is happening with the triangle above, but any other compact set would suffice.

=== Chaos game ===
Animated creation of a Sierpiński triangle using the chaos game

If one takes a point and applies each of the transformations d_{A}, d_{B}, and d_{C} to it randomly, the resulting points will be dense in the Sierpiński triangle, so the following algorithm will again generate arbitrarily close approximations to it:

Start by labeling p_{1}, p_{2} and p_{3} as the corners of the Sierpiński triangle, and a random point v_{1}. Set v_{n+1} = 1/2(v_{n} + p_{r_{n}}), where r_{n} is a random number 1, 2 or 3. Draw the points v_{1} to v_{∞}. If the first point v_{1} was a point on the Sierpiński triangle, then all the points v_{n} lie on the Sierpiński triangle. If the first point v_{1} to lie within the perimeter of the triangle is not a point on the Sierpiński triangle, none of the points v_{n} will lie on the Sierpiński triangle, however they will converge on the triangle. If v_{1} is outside the triangle, the only way v_{n} will land on the actual triangle, is if v_{n} is on what would be part of the triangle, if the triangle were infinitely large.

Or more simply:

1. Take three points in a plane to form a triangle.
2. Randomly select any point inside the triangle and consider that your current position.
3. Randomly select any one of the three vertex points.
4. Move half the distance from your current position to the selected vertex.
5. Plot the current position.
6. Repeat from step 3.

This method is also called the chaos game, and is an example of an iterated function system. You can start from any point outside or inside the triangle, and it would eventually form the Sierpiński Gasket with a few leftover points (if the starting point lies on the outline of the triangle, there are no leftover points). With pencil and paper, a brief outline is formed after placing approximately one hundred points, and detail begins to appear after a few hundred.

=== Arrowhead construction of Sierpiński gasket ===
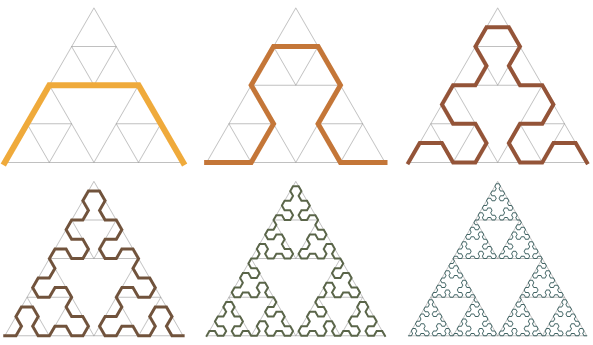
Arrowhead construction of the Sierpiński gasket

Another construction for the Sierpiński gasket shows that it can be constructed as a curve in the plane. It is formed by a process of repeated modification of simpler curves, analogous to the construction of the Koch snowflake:

1. Start with a single line segment in the plane
2. Repeatedly replace each line segment of the curve with three shorter segments, forming 120° angles at each junction between two consecutive segments, with the first and last segments of the curve either parallel to the original line segment or forming a 60° angle with it.

At every iteration, this construction gives a continuous curve. In the limit, these approach a curve that traces out the Sierpiński triangle by a single continuous directed (infinitely wiggly) path, which is called the Sierpiński arrowhead. In fact, the aim of Sierpiński's original article in 1915 was to show an example of a curve (a Cantorian curve), as the title of the article itself declares.

=== Cellular automata ===
The Sierpiński triangle also appears in certain cellular automata (such as Rule 90), including those relating to Conway's Game of Life. For instance, the Life-like cellular automaton B1/S12 when applied to a single cell will generate four approximations of the Sierpiński triangle. A very long, one cell–thick line in standard life will create two mirrored Sierpiński triangles. The time-space diagram of a replicator pattern in a cellular automaton also often resembles a Sierpiński triangle, such as that of the common replicator in HighLife. The Sierpiński triangle can also be found in the Ulam-Warburton automaton and the Hex-Ulam-Warburton automaton.

=== Pascal's triangle ===
An approximation to a Sierpiński triangle obtained by shading the first 2^{5} (32) levels of a Pascal's triangle white if the binomial coefficient is even and black otherwise

If one takes Pascal's triangle with $2^n$ rows and colors the even numbers white, and the odd numbers black, the result is an approximation to the Sierpiński triangle. More precisely, the limit as n approaches infinity of this parity-colored $2^n$-row Pascal triangle is the Sierpiński triangle.

As the proportion of black numbers tends to zero with increasing n, a corollary is that the proportion of odd binomial coefficients tends to zero as n tends to infinity.

=== Towers of Hanoi ===
The Towers of Hanoi puzzle involves moving disks of different sizes between three pegs, maintaining the property that no disk is ever placed on top of a smaller disk. The states of an n-disk puzzle, and the allowable moves from one state to another, form an undirected graph, the Hanoi graph, that can be represented geometrically as the intersection graph of the set of triangles remaining after the nth step in the construction of the Sierpiński triangle. Thus, in the limit as n goes to infinity, this sequence of graphs can be interpreted as a discrete analogue of the Sierpiński triangle.

== Properties ==
For objects of integer dimension $d$, scaling a figure by a factor of 2 (that is, applying a homothetic transformation of ratio 2) produces $2^d$ congruent copies that fit inside the enlarged figure: for instance, doubling a line segment (1-dimensional) yields 2 copies, a square (2-dimensional) yields 4, and a cube (3-dimensional) yields 8.

For the Sierpiński triangle, when the figure is scaled by a factor of 2, the enlarged version can be exactly partitioned into 3 scaled copies of itself, each of scale ratio $\tfrac{1}{2}$. Therefore, the relationship $3 = 2^d$ holds, and solving for $d$ gives the Hausdorff dimension

$d = \tfrac{\log 3}{\log 2} \approx 1.585.$

At each iterative stage of its construction, the area that remains equals $\tfrac{3}{4}$ of that from the previous stage. Consequently, after $n$ iterations, the total area is $\left(\tfrac{3}{4}\right)^n$ of the original. In the limit as $n \to \infty$, the total area tends to zero (in the sense of Lebesgue measure).

The points of a Sierpiński triangle have a simple characterization in barycentric coordinates. If a point has barycentric coordinates $(0.u_1u_2u_3\dots, 0.v_1v_2v_3\dots, 0.w_1w_2w_3\dots)$, expressed in binary numeral form, then the point lies in the Sierpiński triangle if and only if $u_i + v_i + w_i = 1$ for all $i$.

== Generalization to other moduli ==
A generalization of the Sierpiński triangle can also be generated using Pascal's triangle if a different modulus $P$ is used. Iteration $n$ can be generated by taking a Pascal's triangle with $P^n$ rows and coloring numbers by their value modulo $P$. As $n$ approaches infinity, a fractal is generated.

The same fractal can be achieved by dividing a triangle into a tessellation of $P^2$ similar triangles and removing the triangles that are upside-down from the original, then iterating this step with each smaller triangle.

Conversely, the fractal can also be generated by beginning with a triangle and duplicating it and arranging $\tfrac{n(n+1)}{2}$ of the new figures in the same orientation into a larger similar triangle with the vertices of the previous figures touching, then iterating that step.

== Analogues in higher dimensions ==
Sierpiński pyramid recursion (8 steps)

The Sierpiński tetrahedron or tetrix is the three-dimensional analogue of the Sierpiński triangle, formed by repeatedly shrinking a regular tetrahedron to one half its original height, putting together four copies of this tetrahedron with corners touching, and then repeating the process.

The Sierpiński tetrahedron can also be formed by starting with a single tetrahedron, removing octahedra from it or recursively combining quadruples of tetrahedra into larger tetrahedra.

A tetrix constructed from an initial tetrahedron of side-length $L$ has the property that the total surface area remains constant with each iteration. The initial surface area of the (iteration-0) tetrahedron of side-length $L$ is $L^2\sqrt3$. The next iteration consists of four copies with side length $\tfrac{L}{2}$, so the total area is $4\bigl(\tfrac{L}{2}\bigr)^2\sqrt3=L^2\sqrt3$ again. Subsequent iterations again quadruple the number of copies and halve the side length, preserving the overall area. Meanwhile, the volume of the construction is halved at every step and therefore approaches zero. The limit of this process has neither volume nor surface but, like the Sierpiński gasket, is an intricately connected curve. Its Hausdorff dimension is $\tfrac{\log4}{\log2}=2$; here "log" denotes the natural logarithm, the numerator is the logarithm of the number of copies of the shape formed from each copy of the previous iteration, and the denominator is the logarithm of the factor by which these copies are scaled down from the previous iteration. If all points are projected onto a plane that is parallel to two of the outer edges, they exactly fill a square of side length $\tfrac{L}{\sqrt2}$ without overlap.

Animation of a rotating level-4 tetrix showing how some orthographic projections of a tetrix can fill a plane – in this interactive SVG, move left and right over the tetrix to rotate the 3D model

Successive stages in carving the Sierpiński tetrahedron, followed by its projection onto a plane to reveal the Gosper–Lafitte triangle.

== History ==
Wacław Sierpiński described the Sierpiński triangle in 1915. However, similar patterns appear already as a common motif of 13th-century Cosmatesque inlay stonework.

The Apollonian gasket, named for Apollonius of Perga (3rd century BC), was first described by Gottfried Leibniz (17th century) and is a curved precursor of the 20th-century Sierpiński triangle.

== Physics ==
Sierpiński triangle-like structures have been built out of carbon monoxide molecules on a copper surface, using scanning tunneling microscopy (STM) tools. Inspired by this, theoretical works based on quantum Monte Carlo algorithms investigate the electronic structure.

== Etymology ==
The usage of the word "gasket" to refer to the Sierpiński triangle refers to gaskets such as are found in motors, and which sometimes feature a series of holes of decreasing size, similar to the fractal; this usage was coined by Benoit Mandelbrot, who thought the fractal looked similar to "the part that prevents leaks in motors".

== See also ==
- Apollonian gasket, a set of mutually tangent circles with the same combinatorial structure as the Sierpiński triangle
- List of fractals by Hausdorff dimension
- Sierpiński carpet, another fractal named after Sierpiński and formed by repeatedly removing squares from a larger square
- Triforce, a relic in the Legend of Zelda series
- Analysis on fractals, in which a key example is the Laplacian on the Sierpiński gasket
