= Planning =

Regarding the activities required to achieve a desired goal

Planning is the process of thinking regarding the activities required to achieve a desired goal. Planning is based on foresight, the fundamental capacity for mental time travel. Some researchers regard the evolution of forethought - the capacity to think ahead - as a prime mover in human evolution. Planning is a fundamental property of intelligent behavior. It involves the use of logic and imagination to visualize not only a desired result, but the steps necessary to achieve that result.

An important aspect of planning is its relationship to forecasting. Forecasting aims to predict what the future will look like, while planning imagines what the future could look like.

Planning according to established principles - most notably since the early-20th century - forms a core part of many professional occupations, particularly in fields such as management and business. Once people have developed a plan, they can measure and assess progress, efficiency and effectiveness. As circumstances change, plans may need to be modified or even abandoned.

In light of the popularity of the concept of planning, some adherents of the idea advocate planning for unplannable eventualities.

== Psychology ==
Planning has been modeled in terms of intentions: deciding what tasks one might wish to do; tenacity: continuing towards a goal in the face of difficulty and flexibility, adapting one's approach in response implementation. An implementation intention is a specification of behavior that an individual believes to be correlated with a goal will take place, such as at a particular time or in a particular place. Implementation intentions are distinguished from goal intentions, which specifies an outcome such as running a marathon.

== Neurology ==
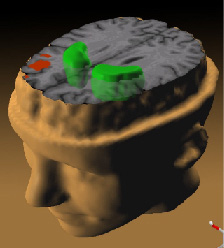
The striatum; part of the basal ganglia; neural pathways between the striatum and the frontal lobe have been implicated in planning function.

Planning is one of the executive functions of the brain, encompassing the neurological processes involved in the formulation, evaluation and selection of a sequence of thoughts and actions to achieve a desired goal. Various studies utilizing a combination of neuropsychological, neuropharmacological and functional neuroimaging approaches have suggested there is a positive relationship between impaired planning ability and damage to the frontal lobe.

A specific area within the mid-dorsolateral frontal cortex located in the frontal lobe has been implicated as playing an intrinsic role in both cognitive planning and associated executive traits such as working memory.

Disruption of the neural pathways, via various mechanisms such as traumatic brain injury, or the effects of neurodegenerative diseases between this area of the frontal cortex and the basal ganglia, specifically the striatum (corticostriatal pathway), may disrupt the processes required for normal planning function.

Individuals who were born very low birth weight (<1500 grams) and extremely low birth weight are at greater risk for various cognitive deficits including planning ability.

The other region activated in planning process is default mode network which contributes to activity of remembering the past and imagine the future. This network distributed set of regions that involve association cortex and paralimbic region but spare sensory and motor cortex this is make possible planning process disruption by active task that uses sensory and motoric regions.

=== Neuropsychological tests ===
Animation of a four disc version of the Tower of Hanoi

There are a variety of neuropsychological tests which can be used to measure variance of planning ability between the subject and controls.

- Tower of Hanoi, a puzzle invented in 1883 by the French mathematician Édouard Lucas. There are different variations of the puzzle: the classic version consists of three rods and usually seven to nine discs of subsequently smaller size. Planning is a key component of the problem-solving skills necessary to achieve the objective, which is to move the entire stack to another rod, obeying the following rules:
  - Only one disk may be moved at a time.
  - Each move consists of taking the upper disk from one of the rods and sliding it onto another rod, on top of the other disks that may already be present on that rod.
  - No disk may be placed on top of a smaller disk.

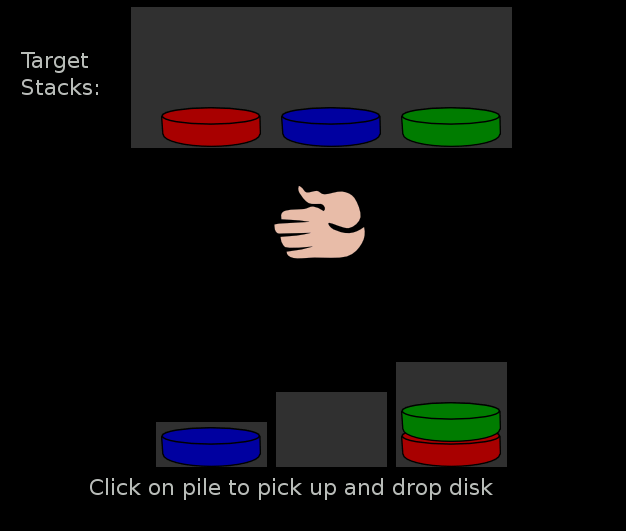
Screenshot of the PEBL psychology software running the Tower of London test

- Tower of London is another test that was developed in 1992 by Tim Shallice specifically to detect deficits in planning as may occur with damage to the frontal lobe. Test participants with damage to the left anterior frontal lobe demonstrated planning deficits (i.e., greater number of moves required for solution).

Test participants with damage to the right anterior, and left or right posterior areas of the frontal lobes, showed no impairment. The results implicating the left anterior frontal lobes involvement in solving the Tower of London were supported in concomitant neuroimaging studies which also showed a reduction in regional cerebral blood flow to the left pre-frontal lobe. For the number of moves, a significant negative correlation was observed for the left prefrontal area: i.e. subjects that took more time planning their moves showed greater activation in the left prefrontal area.

== Planning theories ==
=== Business ===
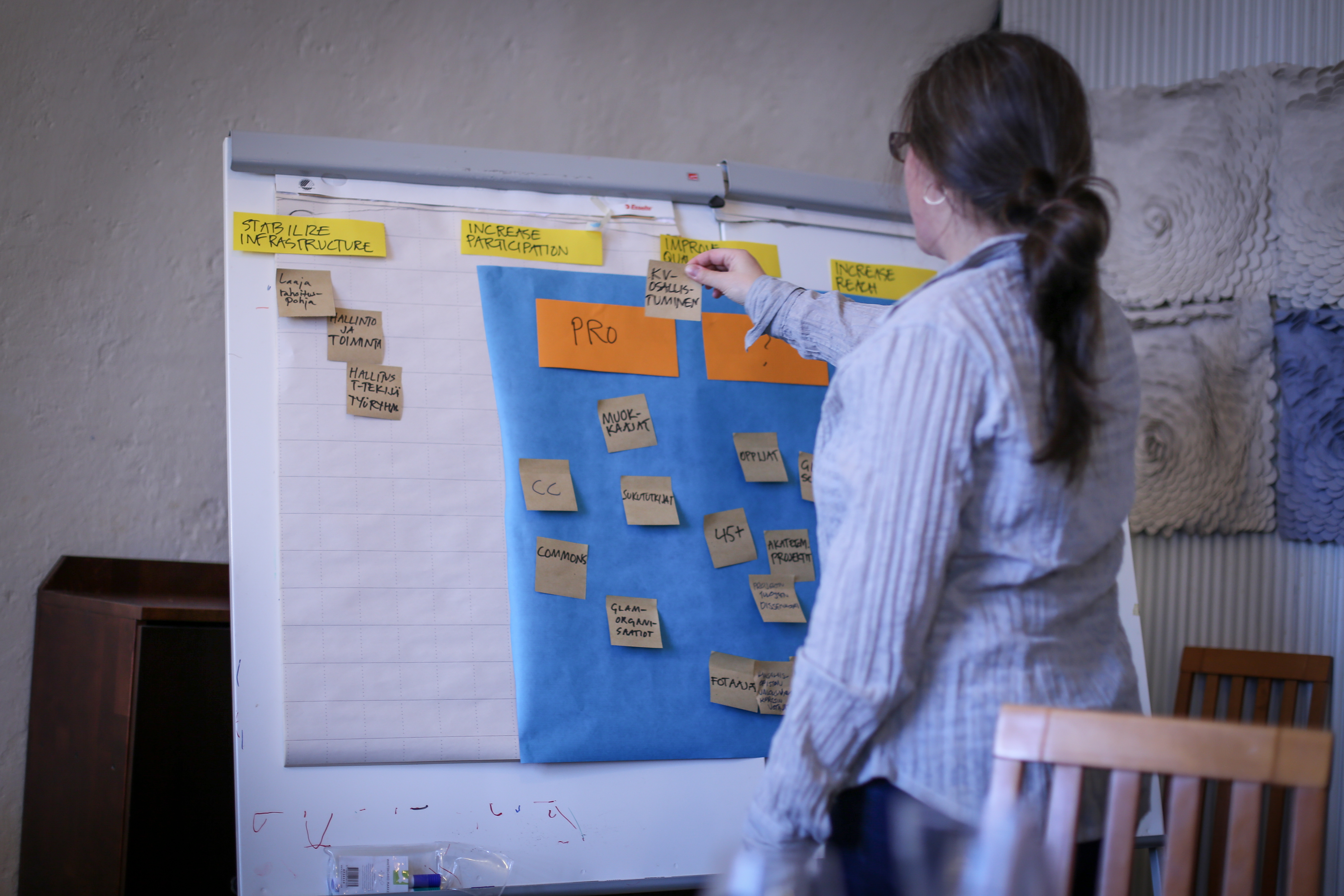
Post-it Notes on a whiteboard, articulating a plan

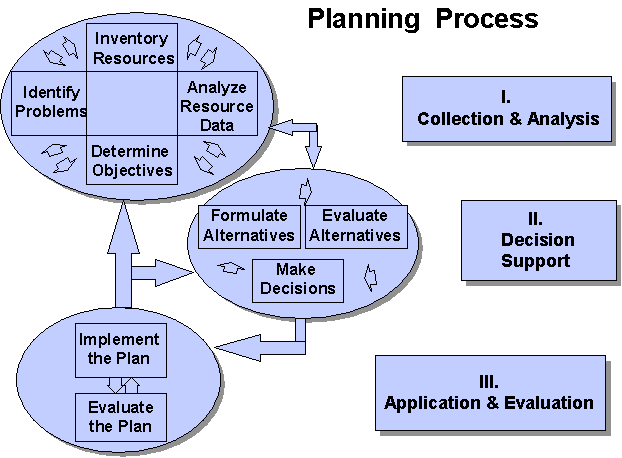
Example of planning process framework

Patrick Montana and Bruce Charnov outline a three-step result-oriented process for planning:

1. Choosing a destination
2. Evaluating alternative routes
3. Deciding the specific course of the plan

In organizations, planning can become a management process, concerned with defining goals for a future direction and determining on the missions and resources to achieve those targets. To meet the goals, managers may develop plans such as a business plan or a marketing plan. Planning always has a purpose. The purpose may involve the achievement of certain goals or targets: efficient use of resources, reducing risk, expanding the organization and its assets, etc.

=== Public policy ===
Public policies include laws, rules, decisions, and decrees. Public policy can be defined as efforts to tackle social issues via policymaking. A policy is crafted with a specific goal in mind in order to address a societal problem that has been prioritized by the government.

Public policy planning includes environmental, land use, regional, urban and spatial planning. In many countries, the operation of a town and country planning system is often referred to as "planning" and the professionals which operate the system are known as "planners".

=== Personal ===
Planning is not just a professional activity: it is a feature of everyday life, whether for career advancement, organizing an event or even just getting through a busy day.

== Alternatives to planning ==
Opportunism can supplement or replace planning.

== Types of planning ==
- Automated planning and scheduling
- Business plan
- Central planning
- Collaborative planning, forecasting, and replenishment
- Comprehensive planning
- Contingency planning
- Economic planning
- Enterprise architecture planning
- Environmental planning
- Event planning
- Family planning
- Financial planning
- Land use planning
- Landscape planning
- Lesson planning
- Marketing plan
- Maintenance
- Network resource planning
- Operational planning
- Planning Domain Definition Language
- Regional planning
- Site planning
- Spatial planning
- Strategic planning
- Succession planning
- Time management
- Urban planning

== See also ==
- Futures studies
- Learning theory (education)
- Planning fallacy
- Project management
- Time management
