= Vienna Test System =

Digital psychological assessment system

The Vienna Test System (VTS) is a test system for computerized psychological assessments. It was developed in the 1980's by the Schuhfried Company, founded by Dr. Felix Schuhfried in 1947.

VTS allows digital psychological tests to be administered while also providing automatic and comprehensive scoring. It includes classical questionnaires and tests that can only be scored by a computer, such as time-sensitive test presentation, multi-media presentation, adaptive tests, psychomotricity, combinations of tests for specific purposes (test sets) and differentiated scoring of individual responses,

== History ==
Initial developments of a computerized test system at Schuhfried Company date back to the 1970s and were based on the company's experience in the field of apparative assessments. An important strand of apparative assessments in psychology was the development of devices for measuring brief and very brief stimulus presentation and reaction times, such as the tachistoscope for assessing perception and attention. Schuhfried was one of the first companies to realize that computers could replace test-specific electro-mechanical instruments.

In the 1980s, VTS was introduced. It initially had its own hardware and operating system components designed in particular to ensure real-time control and measurement. Electro-mechanical devices were controlled by computer; individual tests required a control module and a special respondent interface for stimulus presentation and input of responses. Standardized respondent desks providing additional optical and acoustic stimulus presentation options and multiple response keys (including number keys) and pedals then supplemented and replaced the individual devices. Presentation was shifted more to the screen.

In 1986 the first VTS was launched. It used a personal computer as hardware. For many years the VTS was the only available system in this field to achieve professional application acceptance. Competing systems gradually emerged as the now widespread practice of internet-based psychological diagnostic grew, leading to wide diversification.

== The present system ==
In 2013, Schuhfried launched a new VTS. Four specialist versions are available for use in HR, Neuro, Sport, and Traffic psychology. Interactive interfaces enable the new VTS to be integrated into existing workflows and computer programs such as applicant management systems and hospital IT environments.

Many psychological tests can be administered online without the need to install software.

== Tests ==
More than 120 tests are now available, Every year some 13 million tests in more than 68 countries and 30 languages are administered using VTS . These include:

- DT: The Determination Test (DT) is a test of reactive stress tolerance and the associated ability to react. The respondent is presented with color stimuli and acoustic signals. He/she reacts by pressing the appropriate buttons on the response panel.
- RT: The Reaction Test (RT) provides a measurement of motor speed and reaction speed. The respondent is required to press a specified key on the response panel when relevant stimuli appear.
- INSBAT: The Intelligence Structure Battery (INSBAT) assess occupationally relevant skills. The INSBAT is based on the hierarchical intelligence model of Cattell-Horn-Carroll (Carroll, 1993; Horn, 1989; Horn & Noll, 1997).
- TOL-F: The Tower of London – Freiburg Version (TOL-F) is a computerized test that assesses planning ability in healthy people and neurological and psychiatric patients; it has been comprehensively normed in German-speaking countries. The planning test is based on the Tower of Hanoi as developed by neurologist Tim Shallice.
- WRBTV: The Vienna Risk-taking Test Traffic (WRBTV) is an objective personality test that measures readiness to take risks when driving. It is based on the risk homeostasis theory of the Canadian psychologist G. J. S. Wilde.
- FGT: The Figural Memory Test (FGT) is a language-free test of figural learning ability and figural episodic memory. FGT is suitable for use with healthy people and neurological and psychiatric patients.
- OLMT: The Objective Achievement Motivation Test (OLMT) is a computerized, objective and behavior-based personality test for measuring achievement motivation. It provides information about the effort applied when working on tasks under various different conditions.

=== Early diagnosis of dementia ===
The DSM-5 classification system defines special diagnostic criteria for neurocognitive disorders in this field; these are assessed by the test set CFD – Cognitive Functions Dementia. Using a touch-screen, the test set assesses attention, verbal long-term memory, executive functions, expressive language and perceptual/motor functions and combines the results to arrive at a global CFD index.

=== Aviation ===
To meet the specific requirements of aviation, a special test set (SAAIR Safety Assessment Air) was developed to assess psychological factors relevant to flying such as resilience, memory and spatial ability and other aspects such as psychomotor coordination.
