= Interactions between the emotional and executive brain systems =

The neurocircuitry that underlies executive function processes and emotional and motivational processes are known to be distinct in the brain. However, there are brain regions that show overlap in function between the two cognitive systems. Brain regions that exist in both systems are interesting mainly for studies on how one system affects the other. Examples of such cross-modal functions are emotional regulation strategies such as emotional suppression and emotional reappraisal, the effect of mood on cognitive tasks, and the effect of emotional stimulation of cognitive tasks.

A variety of methods can be used to examine the relationship between executive function and emotion, including behavioural studies, functional brain activity, and neuroanatomy. Some of the most prominent results are listed here.

== Behavioural studies ==
=== Mood affects style of information processing ===
A large body of research has looked at the effects of positive or negative mood manipulations on performance in tasks of executive function. In most cases, positive mood inductions impair executive function, whereas negative mood has little effect. Overall, the best supported explanation for the observed effects is that mood affects processing style, with positive mood facilitating more heuristic methods of solving problems, and negative mood facilitating more algorithmic methods. Research in this area is incomplete, as negative mood inductions are less thoroughly studied.

=== Effects of mood on working memory and planning ===
In word span tasks, positive mood caused greater deficits in complex tasks compared to simpler tasks, where negative mood had no effect. In a Tower of London planning task, positive mood caused poorer planning performance compared to neutral mood. Researchers in both cases suggested that lack of effect could be explained by insufficient mood manipulation methods.

=== Effects of mood on fluency and creativity ===
In word fluency tasks, one study has shown that positive mood results in better fluency over negative mood, while another has shown that negative mood results in higher word production. A third study did not find any effect of either mood manipulation. However, there is some evidence that positive mood can result in increased performance in some tasks requiring creative thinking. No evidence of negative mood on creative thinking is available.

=== Effects of mood on inhibition and switching ===
In the Stroop task, a near significant trend was found for Stroop costs in positive mood conditions. In two tasks of switching, it was found that positive mood results in impaired switching compared to a neutral condition. Little evidence is found for the effect of negative mood.

=== Interpretation ===
Taken together positive mood impairs tasks of working memory, planning, word production, inhibition and switching, and facilitates word fluency. Negative mood impairs fluency, but facilitates planning tasks, word production, and has not shown any effect for tasks of working memory, creativity, inhibition, or switching. The results, while incomplete, would be consistent with the interpretation that mood influences style of processing.

== Prefrontal cortex regions involved in emotional regulation ==
Some of the more significant cortical areas involved in emotional regulation include the ventrolateral prefrontal cortex, medial prefrontal cortex, dorsolateral prefrontal cortex and dorsomedial prefrontal cortex.

=== Ventrolateral prefrontal cortex (vlPFC) ===
The ventrolateral prefrontal cortex (vlPFC) is a subdivision of the prefrontal cortex. Its involvement in modulating existing behavior and emotional output given contextual demands has been studied extensively using cognitive reappraisal studies and emotion-attention tasks. Cognitive reappraisal studies indicate the vlFPC's role in reinterpreting stimuli, and reducing or augmenting responses. Studies using emotion-attention tasks demonstrate the vlFPC's function in ignoring emotional distractions while the brain is engaged in performing other tasks.

=== Medial prefrontal cortex (mPFC) ===
The medial prefrontal cortex (mPFC) is a subdivision of the prefrontal cortex. It encodes expected outcomes, both positive and negative, and signals when the expected outcomes do not occur. The mPFC, mediated by the amygdala, is also involved in the extinction and modulation of conditioned responses, including emotional ones, and the augmentation of emotional states. The function of the mPFC in higher order emotional processing is still unclear.

=== Dorsal prefrontal cortex ===
The dorsolateral prefrontal cortex (dlPFC) and the dorsomedial prefrontal cortex (dmPFC) are implicated in the enhancement of representations of stimuli relevant to current decisions, behaviors or tasks. These areas also play a role in modulating emotions and dealing with emotional distractions during demanding tasks, and are also implicated in facilitating decision/resolve perceptual or conflict making by augmenting representations of stimuli relevant to decision or behavior. The dmPFC's role in human emotional regulation decision making (decision conflict perspective – levels of indecision) e.g. Picking between similar items, acting in novel situations. There is also evidence of an inverse relationship between activation in the dPFC areas and activation in emotionally activated brain areas.

== Ventral and dorsal streams ==
=== Ventral stream ===
The ventral stream primarily involves the vlPFC and mPFC. Signals of expected outcomes trigger the mPFC to update stimulus associations through exchanges with the amygdala and the nucleus accumbens. When a response change is needed, the mPFC interacts with the vlPFC. Then, the vlPFC modulates the emotional response to stimuli through interactions with the dorsal striatum. Preliminary findings indicate that the vlPFC may also modulate activity in the nucleus accumbens, temporal cortex, anterior insula and amygdala.

=== Dorsal stream ===
The dorsal stream activates by the presence of response conflict. The dmPFC relays information on past reinforcement to the dlPFC, which initiates selective attention. dlPFC influences action and emotion by weighing the importance of competing goals/representations in the temporal cortex. Representations opposite to what the stimulus originally elicited are rendered more salient and compete with the original representations. These competitions influence the modulation of activity in the amygdala and the mPFC.

== Adolescent development ==
An imbalance between the relative influence between the emotional and executive systems is posited to be responsible for the heightened levels of risk-taking and emotionality observed in adolescents. Specifically, dopamine-rich regions related to motivation, including the ventral striatum which has been shown to represent the appetitive value of a stimulus, show increased signaling in adolescent years. This is suggested to be indicative of maturation in this region. In contrast, it is known that regions of the brain known to be involved with modulation of emotional effect on executive function, including the vlPFC, as well as the entire ventrolateral frontostriatal network, do not fully mature until late adolescence to early adulthood. Recent research has shown that adolescents are less capable of inhibiting responses to pre-potent stimuli. Additionally, the ventral striatum and frontolateral prefrontal cortex showed patterns of activity that are more connected with each other during adolescence than early adulthood. While it is accepted that adolescents are less able to inhibit responding to tempting stimuli, it is unclear the specific neural mechanism that modulates this phenomenon.

== Other research ==
The emotional-oddball paradigm is a variation on the traditional oddball paradigm used in neuroscience. Studies show emotionally enhanced memory during trials depicting negative imagery when people participate in visual, simultaneous attention-emotional tasks. Emotional arousal has also been shown to cause augmentation in memory, and enhanced processing and information consolidation when paired with stimuli. This effect has been explained by the arousal-biased competition (ABC) model, which postulates that bottom-up sensory preference to arousing stimuli and top-down relevance to current activity or goal pursuit both influence how priority is determined for an event. More simply, if an event is paired with a particularly emotionally arousing stimulus, it will be more salient to processing and have greater resources devoted to it.
