= Pebl =

PEBL may refer to:

== Electronics ==
- Motorola Pebl a former model of cellular phone

== Software ==
- PEBL (software) a programming language
