= TravelMuse =

Travel planning website

- Company type: Travel planning service
- Founded: Kevin Fliess and Eric Wood
- Headquarters: Los Altos, California
- Website: https://www.travelmuse.com
- Launched: June 2008

TravelMuse is an online travel planning website. TravelMuse claims booking is just the last 5% of the process.

== History ==
TravelMuse (formerly known as TripOvation) was founded in May 2007 by Kevin Fliess and Eric Wood. The company has raised more than $3.5 million in funding from Azure Capital Partners and California Technology Ventures. TravelMuse is headquartered in Los Altos, California.
