= PEBL =

PEBL may mean or refer to:

- PEBL (software), Psychology Experiment Building Language, a platform for administering psychological exams
- Motorola Pebl, a mobile phone produced by Motorola.
