= Planning (cognitive) =

Neurological executive function

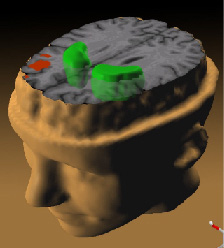
The Striatum; part of the basal ganglia; neural pathways between the striatum and the frontal lobe have been implicated in planning function.

Cognitive planning is one of the executive functions. It encompasses the neurological processes involved in the formulation, evaluation and selection of a sequence of thoughts and actions to achieve a desired goal. Various studies utilizing a combination of neuropsychological, neuropharmacological and functional neuroimaging approaches have suggested there is a positive relationship between impaired planning ability and damage to the frontal lobe.

A specific area within the mid-dorsolateral frontal cortex located in the frontal lobe has been implicated as playing an intrinsic role in both cognitive planning and associated executive traits such as working memory.

Disruption of the neural pathways, via various mechanisms such as traumatic brain injury, or the effects of neurodegenerative diseases between this area of the frontal cortex and the basal ganglia specifically the striatum (cortico-striatal pathway), may disrupt the processes required for normal planning function.

Individuals who were born with very low birth weight (VLBW - <1500 grams) and extremely low birth weight (ELBW) are at greater risk of various cognitive deficits including planning ability.

== Neuropsychological test ==
Animation of a four disc version of the Tower of Hanoi.

There are a variety of neuropsychological tests which can be used to measure variance of planning ability between the subject and controls.

- Tower of Hanoi (TOH-R), a puzzle invented in 1883 by the French mathematician Édouard Lucas. There are variations of the puzzle - the classic version consists of three rods and usually seven to nine discs of subsequently smaller size. Planning is a key component of the problem solving skills necessary to achieve the objective, which is to move the entire stack to another rod, obeying the following rules:
  - Only one disk may be moved at a time.
  - Each move consists of taking the upper disk from one of the rods and sliding it onto another rod, on top of the other disks that may already be present on that rod.
  - No disk may be placed on top of a smaller disk.

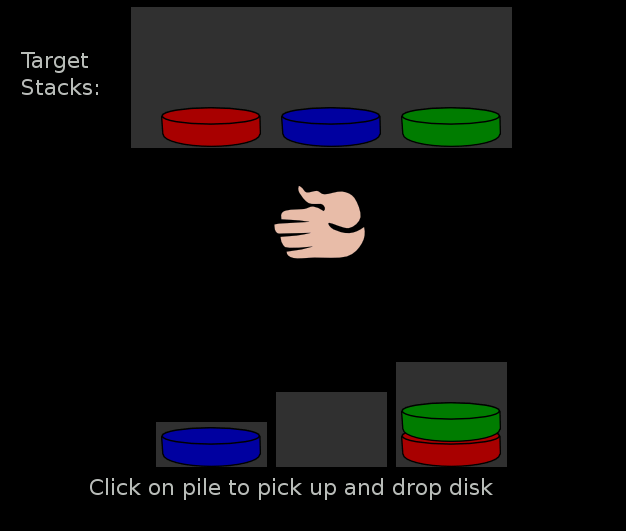
Screenshot of the PEBL psychology software running the Tower of London test

- Tower of London (TOL) is another test that was developed in 1982 (Shallice 1982) specifically to detect deficits in planning as may occur with damage to the frontal lobe. test participants with damage to the left anterior frontal lobe demonstrated planning deficits (i.e., greater number of moves required for solution).

In test, participants with damage to the right anterior, and left or right posterior areas of the frontal lobes showed no impairment. The results implicating the left anterior frontal lobes involvement in solving the TOL were supported in concomitant neuroimaging studies which also showed a reduction in regional cerebral blood flow to the left pre-frontal lobe. For the number of moves, a significant negative correlation was observed for the left prefrontal area, i.e. subjects that took more time planning their moves showed greater activation in the left prefrontal area.

== Bibliography ==
J P Das, Binod C Kar, Rauno K Parrila, Cognitive Planning: The Psychological Basis of Intelligent Behaviour. Sage Publications Pvt. Ltd; illustrated edition. ISBN 0-8039-9287-4 ISBN 978-0-8039-9287-0
