= NRP =

NRP may refer to:

== Science ==
- Neuropilin
- Nonribosomal peptide
- Nurse rostering problem, a problem in computer science

== Political parties ==
- National Renaissance Party (United States)
- National Reform Party (disambiguation)
- National Religious Party, in Israel
- Nevis Reformation Party, in Saint Kitts and Nevis
- New Republic Party (South Africa)
- New Reform Party of Ontario, a defunct party in Ontario, Canada
- New Rights Party, in Georgia
- Nordic Reich Party, in Sweden
- Norodom Ranariddh Party, a royalist opposition party in Cambodia

== Other ==
- Maryland Department of Natural Resources Police, officially abbreviated as NRP
- National Reading Panel
- National Partnership for Reinventing Government, U.S. reform initiative launched in 1993 by Vice President Al Gore
- National Reconciliation Program, a political organization in Burma
- National Reorganization Process, the military dictatorship in Argentina from 1976 to 1983
- National Response Plan, former US Department of Homeland Security plan for domestic incidents
- Navio da República Portuguesa, the ship prefix for Portuguese Navy ships
- Neighbourhood Renewal Programme in Singapore
- Neonatal Resuscitation Program
- Nationally Registered Paramedic, a certification from the National Registry of Emergency Medical Technicians
- Network resource planning
- Nissan Revival Plan
- Northern Rhodesia Police, the national police force of Northern Rhodesia, now Zambia
