= Compensatory tracking task =

Task that assesses eye–hand coordination

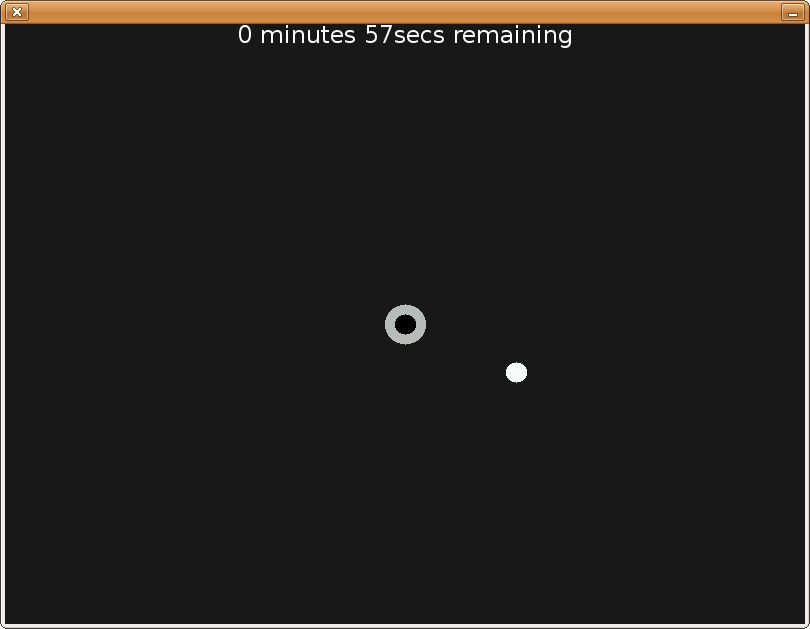
- PEBL compensatory tracking task
- Purpose: eye hand coordination assessment

A compensatory tracking task is a task that assesses eye–hand coordination, in which a user is operating a display that has an indicator and a zero point using a joystick, computer mouse, trackball, or other controlling device. The user must try to keep the indicator within the zero point while the indicator is being acted upon by outside forces.

Early versions of compensatory tracking tasks included a display made of a cathode ray oscilloscope with a rack and pinion connected to a knob that controlled the indicator. The zero point would be displayed on the cathode ray tube. The participant would turn the knob in order to keep the indicator within the zero point.

Time, and distance from the zero point are measured to determine the participant's ability to control the indicator. The early versions of this test were used to help develop better controls. Control modulators such as springs, generators, and electromagnets were used to increase difficulty of the task.

More recently, compensatory tracking tasks has been used to gauge alertness. This is done using a computer monitor and a simulation controlled by a mouse or trackball. Participants use the mouse to keep the indicator within a target which acts as the zero point. Time within the zero point and distance from the zero point are once again measured. Notable versions of the compensatory tracking task are COMPTRACK, and the PEBL compensatory tracking task.

== See also ==
- Pursuit tracking task
