= Mackworth Clock =

Experimental device

The Mackworth Clock is an experimental device used in the field of experimental psychology to study the effects of long term vigilance on the detection of signals. It was originally created by Norman Mackworth as an experimental simulation of long term monitoring by radar operators in the British Air Force during World War II. The device has a large black pointer in a large circular background like a clock. The pointer moves in short jumps like the second hand of an analog clock, approximately every second. At infrequent and irregular intervals, the hand makes a double jump, e.g. 12 times every 30 seconds. The task is to detect when the double jumps occur by pressing a button. Typically, Mackworth's participants would do this task for two hours. The Mackworth Clock was used to establish one of the fundamental findings in the vigilance and sustained attention literature: the vigilance decrement (signal detection accuracy) decreases notably after 30 minutes on task. The test continues to be used today in vigilance research in various forms, including computer-displayed versions.

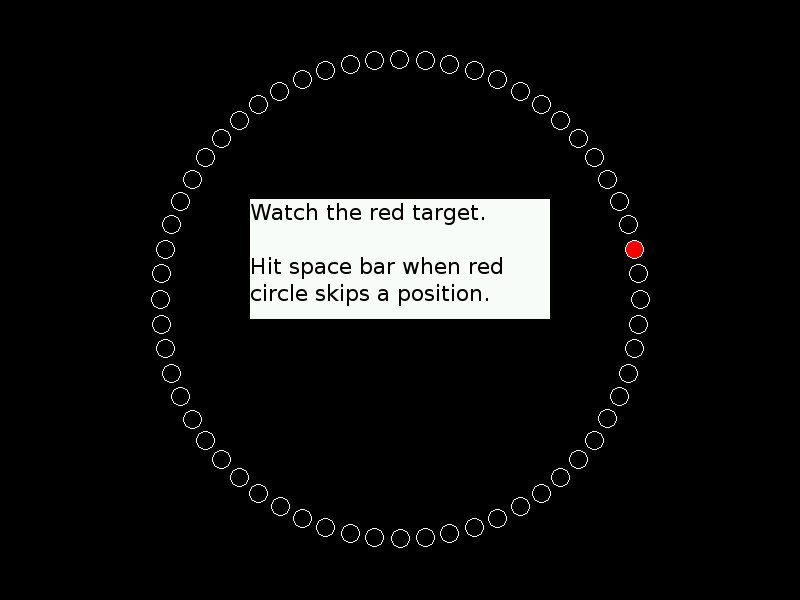
Screenshot of the PEBL computerized version of the Mackworth Clock Test
