= Norman Mackworth =

20th century British psychologist studying boredom, attention, and vigilance

Norman H. "Mack" Mackworth (1917–2005) was a British psychologist and cognitive scientist known for his pioneering work in the study of boredom, attention, and vigilance; the Mackworth Clock test has been used since the 1940s in the study of vigilance.

During the Second World War, Mackworth was recruited by the RAF to study the efficiency of radar operators - after only 30 minutes the operators lost about 10 to 15 percent of their efficiency. His findings resulted in the length of operator duty shifts being severely reduced.

In 1951, Mackworth became head of the Unit for Research in Applied Psychology at Cambridge University, where he remained until emigrating to Canada in 1958.
