= 1024 (number) =

← 1023	1024	1025 →
- List of numbers; Integers; ← 0 1k 2k 3k 4k 5k 6k 7k 8k 9k →
- Cardinal: one thousand twenty-four
- Ordinal: 1024th (one thousand twenty-fourth)
- Factorization: 2^{10}
- Divisors: 1, 2, 4, 8, 16, 32, 64, 128, 256, 512, 1024
- Greek numeral: ,ΑΚΔ´
- Roman numeral: MXXIV, mxxiv
- Binary: 10000000000_{2}
- Ternary: 1101221_{3}
- Senary: 4424_{6}
- Octal: 2000_{8}
- Duodecimal: 714_{12}
- Hexadecimal: 400_{16}

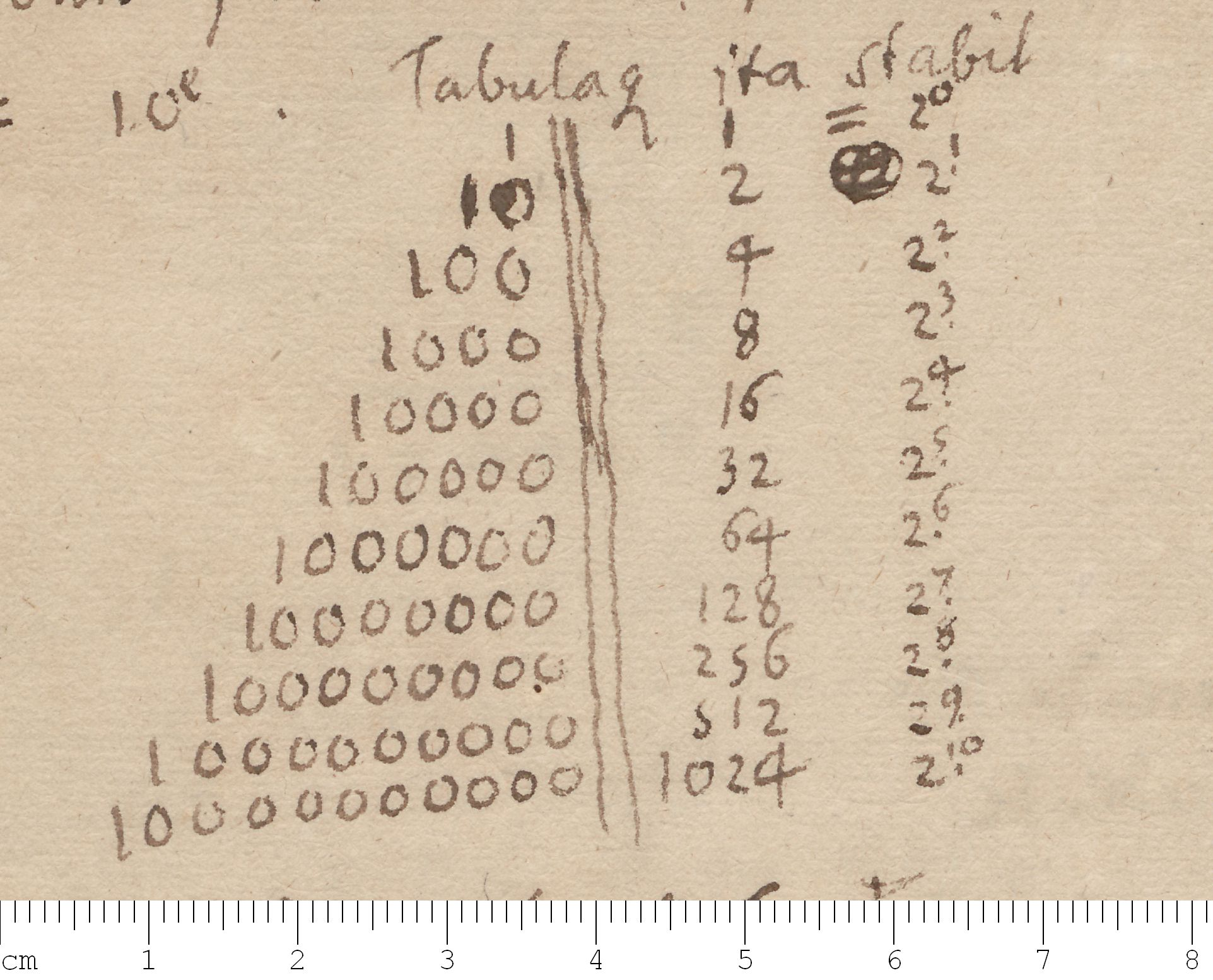
The number 1024 in a treatise on binary numbers by Leibniz (1697)

1024 (one thousand [and] twenty-four) is the natural number following 1023 and preceding 1025.

== In mathematics ==
1024 is a power of two: 2^{10} (2 to the tenth power) and a power of four: 4^{5} (four to the fifth power). It is the nearest power of two from decimal 1000 and senary 10000_{6} (decimal 1296). It is the 64th quarter square. It is the smallest four-digit perfect square: 1024 = 32^{2}.

1024 is the smallest number with exactly 11 divisors (but there are smaller numbers with more than 11 divisors; e.g., 60 has 12 divisors) (sequence A005179 in the OEIS).

1024 is a Friedman number.

== Enumeration of groups ==
The number of groups of order 1024 is 49487367289, up to isomorphism. An earlier calculation gave this number as 49487365422, but in 2021 this was shown to be in error.

This count is more than 99% of all the isomorphism classes of groups of order less than 2000.

== Approximation to 1000 ==
The neat coincidence that 2^{10} is nearly equal to 10^{3} provides the basis of a technique of estimating larger powers of 2 in decimal notation. Using 2^{10a+b} ≈ 2^{b}10^{3a}(or 2^{a}≈2^{a mod 10}10^{floor(a/10)} if "a" stands for the whole power) is fairly accurate for exponents up to about 100. For exponents up to 300, 3a continues to be a good estimate of the number of digits.

For example, 2^{53} ≈ 8×10^{15}. The actual value is closer to 9×10^{15}.

In the case of larger exponents, the relationship becomes increasingly inaccurate, with errors exceeding an order of magnitude for a ≥ 97. For example:

$$\begin{align}
\frac{2^{1000}}{10^{300}}
&= \exp \left( \ln \left( \frac{2^{1000}}{10^{300}} \right) \right) \\
&= \exp \left( \ln \left( 2^{1000}\right) - \ln\left(10^{300}\right)\right)\\
&\approx \exp\left(693.147-690.776\right)\\
&\approx \exp\left(2.372\right)\\
&\approx 10.72
\end{align}$$

In measuring bytes, 1024 is often used in place of 1000 as the quotients of the units byte, kilobyte, megabyte, etc. In 1999, the IEC coined the term kibibyte for multiples of 1024, with kilobyte being used for multiples of 1000.

== Special use in computers ==
In binary notation, 1024 is represented as 10000000000, making it a simple round number occurring frequently in computer applications.

1024 is the maximum number of computer memory addresses that can be referenced with ten binary switches. This is the origin of the organization of computer memory into 1024-byte chunks or kibibytes.

In the Rich Text Format (RTF), language code 1024 indicates the text is not in any language and should be skipped over when proofing. Most used languages codes in RTF are integers slightly over 1024.

1024×768 pixels and 1280×1024 pixels are common standards of display resolution.

1024 is the lowest non-system and non-reserved port number in TCP/IP networking. Ports above this number can usually be opened for listening by non-superusers.

== See also ==
- Powers of 1024
