= Eye–hand coordination =

Coordination between the eyes and hand

Eye–hand coordination (also known as hand–eye coordination) is the coordinated motor control of eye movement with hand movement and the processing of visual input to guide reaching and grasping along with the use of proprioception of the hands to guide the eyes, a modality of multisensory integration. Eye–hand coordination has been studied in activities as diverse as the movement of solid objects such as wooden blocks, archery, sporting performance, music reading, computer gaming, copy-typing, and even tea-making. It is part of the mechanisms of performing everyday tasks; in its absence, most people would not be able to carry out even the simplest of actions such as picking up a book from a table.

== Behaviour and kinematics ==
Neuroscientists have extensively researched human gaze behaviour, noting that the use of the gaze is very task-specific, but that humans typically exhibit proactive control to guide their movement. Usually the eyes fixate on a target before the hands are used to engage in a movement, indicating that the eyes provide spatial information for the hands. The duration that the eyes appear to lock onto a goal for a hand movement varies—sometimes the eyes remain fixated until a task is completed. Other times, the eyes seem to scout ahead toward other objects of interest before the hand even grasps and manipulates the object.

=== Eye-guided hand movement ===
When eyes and hands are used for core exercises, the eyes generally direct the movement of the hands to targets. Furthermore, the eyes provide initial information of the object, including its size, shape, and possibly grasping sites for judging the force the fingertips need to exert to engage in a task.

For sequential tasks, eye-gaze movement occurs during important kinematic events like changing the direction of a movement or when passing perceived landmarks. This is related to the task-search-oriented nature of the eyes and their relation to the movement planning of the hands and the errors between motor signal output and consequences perceived by the eyes and other senses that can be used for corrective movement. The eyes have a tendency to "refixate" on a target to refresh the memory of its shape, or to update for changes in its shape or geometry in drawing tasks that involve the relating of visual input and hand movement to produce a copy of what was perceived. In high accuracy tasks, when acting on greater amounts of visual stimuli, the time it takes to plan and execute movement increases linearly, for example when using a computer mouse, per Fitts's law.

=== Hand-guided saccades ===
Humans have the ability to aim eye movement toward the hand without vision, using the sense of proprioception, with only minor errors related to internal knowledge of limb position. It has been shown the proprioception of limbs, in both active and passive movement, results in saccadic overshoots when the hands are used to guide eye movement. In experiments these overshoots result from the control of eye saccades rather than previous movement of the hands. This implies that limb-based proprioception is capable of being transformed into ocular motor coordinates to guide eye saccades, which allows for the guidance of the saccades by hands and feet.

== Clinical syndromes ==
Numerous disorders, diseases, and impairments have been found to result in disruption to eye–hand coordination, owing to damage to the brain itself, degeneration of the brain due to disease or aging, or an apparent inability to coordinate senses completely.

=== Aging ===
Impairments to eye–hand coordination have been shown in older adults, especially during high-velocity and precise movements. This has been attributed to the general degeneration of the cortex, resulting in a loss of the ability to compute visual inputs and relate them to hand movements. However, while older adults tend to take more time for these sorts of tasks, they are still able to remain just as accurate as younger adults, but only if the additional time is taken.

=== Balint's syndrome ===
Bálint's syndrome is characterized by a complete lack of eye–hand coordination and has been demonstrated to occur in isolation to optic ataxia. It is a rare psychological condition resulting most often from damage bilaterally to the superior parieto-occipital cortex. One of the most common causes is from strokes, but tumours, trauma, and Alzheimer's disease can also cause damage. Balint's syndrome patients can suffer from three major components: optic apraxia, optic ataxia, and simultanagnosia. Simultanagnosia is when patients have difficulty perceiving more than one object at a time. There have been three different approaches for rehabilitation. The first approach is the adaptive or functional approach; it involves functional tasks that use a patient's strengths and abilities. The second approach is remedial approach and involves restoration of the damaged central nervous system by training perceptual skills. The last approach is multi-context approach and involves practising a targeted strategy in a multiple environment with varied tasks and movement demands, along with self-awareness tasks.

=== Optic apraxia ===
Optic apraxia is a condition that results from a total inability of a person to coordinate eye and hand movements. Although similar to optic ataxia, its effects are more severe and do not necessarily come from damage to the brain, but may arise from genetic defects or tissue degeneration.

=== Optic ataxia ===
Optic ataxia or visuomotor ataxia is a clinical problem associated with damage to the occipital–parietal cortex in humans, resulting in a lack of coordination between the eyes and hand. It can affect either one or both hands and can be present in part of the visual field or the entire visual field. Optic ataxia has been often considered to be a high-level impairment of eye–hand coordination resulting from a cascade of failures in the sensory to motor transformations in the posterior parietal cortex. Visual perception, naming, and reading are still possible, but visual information cannot direct hand motor movements. Optic ataxia has been often confused with Balint's syndrome, but recent research has shown that optic ataxia can occur independently of Balint's syndrome. Optic ataxia patients usually have troubles reaching toward visual objects on the side of the world opposite to the side of brain damage. Often these problems are relative to current gaze direction, and appear to be remapped along with changes in gaze direction. Some patients with damage to the parietal cortex show "magnetic reaching": a problem in which reaches seem drawn toward the direction of gaze, even when it is deviated from the desired object of grasp.

=== Parkinson's disease ===
Adults with Parkinson's disease have been observed to show the same impairments as found in normal aging, only to a more extreme degree, in addition to a loss of control of motor functions per normal symptoms of the disease. It is a movement disorder and occurs when there is degeneration of dopaminergic neurons that connect the substantia nigra with the caudate nucleus. A patient's primary symptoms include muscular rigidity, slowness of movement, a resting tremor, and postural instability. The ability to plan and learn from experience has been shown to allow adults with Parkinson's to improvement times, but only under conditions where they are using medications to combat the effects of Parkinson's. Some patients are given L-DOPA, a precursor to dopamine. It is able to cross the blood–brain barrier and then is taken up by dopaminergic neurons and then converted to dopamine.

== See also ==
- Kinematics
- Motor control
- Neuroplasticity
- Human senses
- Compensatory tracking task
- Cheiroscope
