= 1023 (number) =

← 1022	1023	1024 →
- List of numbers; Integers; ← 0 1k 2k 3k 4k 5k 6k 7k 8k 9k →
- Cardinal: one thousand twenty-three
- Ordinal: 1023rd (one thousand twenty-third)
- Factorization: 3 × 11 × 31
- Divisors: 1, 3, 11, 31, 33, 93, 341, 1023
- Greek numeral: ,ΑΚΓ´
- Roman numeral: MXXIII, mxxiii
- Binary: 1111111111_{2}
- Ternary: 1101220_{3}
- Senary: 4423_{6}
- Octal: 1777_{8}
- Duodecimal: 713_{12}
- Hexadecimal: 3FF_{16}

1023 is the natural number following 1022 and preceding 1024.

== Mathematics ==
1023 is a number whose sum of digits is 6, and is a sum of 5 consecutive primes (193, 197, 199, 211 and 223).

It is a sub-perfect power (a perfect power minus 1) specifically 4^{5} − 1 and 2^{10} − 1. The latter of these makes it a Mersenne number, and both of these cause it to be palindromic when converted to bases 2 and 4 (as in both they are a string of 1's).

It is a Stirling number of the second kind, specifically $\textstyle \left\{{11\atop 2}\right\}$.

1023 is the highest number one can count to on one's fingers using binary.

There are 1023 polycubes with 7 cells (when counting reflections as distinct, which is standard).

There are 1023 elements in a 9-simplex.

1023 is the smallest 4-digit number with different digits.

== In other fields ==
=== Computing ===
Floating-point units in computers often run a IEEE 754 64-bit, floating-point excess-1023 format in 11-bit binary. In this format, also called binary64, the exponent of a floating-point number (e.g. 1.009001 E1031) appears as an unsigned binary integer from 0 to 2047, where subtracting 1023 from it gives the actual signed value.

1023 is the number of dimensions or length of messages of an error-correcting Reed-Muller code made of 64 block codes.

=== Technology ===
The Global Positioning System (GPS) works on a ten-digit binary counter that runs for 1024 weeks, 0 to 1023, at which point an integer overflow causes its internal value to roll over to zero again. Also its radio signals (and some other GNSS's) at certain level operate with period of 1023, and the frequencies used are multiples of 1023 kHz (1.023 MHz)).

1023 being $2^{10}-1$, is the maximum number that a 10-bit ADC converter can return when measuring the highest voltage in range.

== See also ==
- AD 1023
