= Network resource planning =

Process of network planning

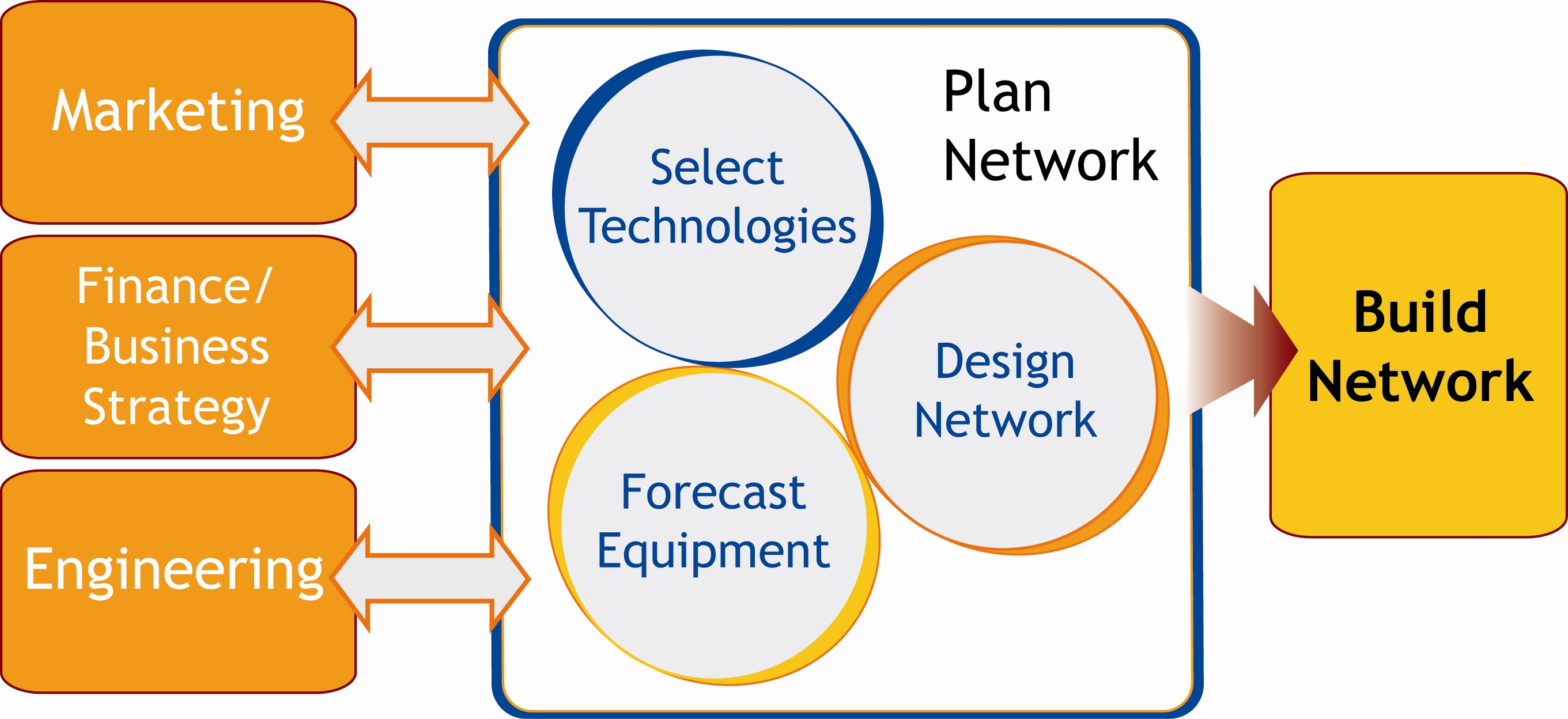
Diagram describing the integration of business planning, marketing and engineering in network resource planning, as well as its end results.

Network resource planning is an enhanced process of network planning that incorporates the disciplines of business planning, marketing, and engineering to develop integrated, dynamic master plans for all domains of communications networks.

== Next generation services ==
Many communications service providers - from wireline, Wireless, broadband to next generation carriers - are introducing next-generation services such as interactive video over cell phones and multi-user conference calling. These new services are straining the capacity of existing networks. In a 2006 Reuters interview, John Roese, CTO of Nortel, pointed out that YouTube almost destroyed the Internet, and in a keynote speech at Cisco’s C-Scape analyst conference in December 2006, John Chambers, CEO of Cisco Networks said, “Things like YouTube are just the baby steps of the impact video will have on networks.” Since every video transmission requires roughly 150 times the bandwidth of a voice transmission, it is estimated that a one percent adoption of the Verizon Wireless V CAST service required a 400 percent increase in Verizon’s corresponding network capacity.

The bandwidth-intense nature of next generation services has required traditional network planning to evolve. Subscriber growth of legacy services like voice and data had an incremental impact on networks. New subscriptions and their corresponding bandwidth demand followed a relatively linear growth curve. As such, planning methods such as link- and node-specific forecasting or “trending” were sufficient to ensure networks could support current and planned subscribers.

The dramatic swings in bandwidth demand that slight variances in subscription rates bring to bear on networks carrying services such as video can no longer be adequately planned for with these traditional methods. Network Resource Planning addresses the weaknesses of trending by incorporating business planning and marketing insight in the planning process. The addition of market analysis adds an additional layer of context and provides a feedback loop that enables more accurate planning. Furthermore, the importance of coordinating infrastructure investment activities across organizations is addressed to ensure that network capacity is provided when and where it is needed, and that human and operational support system resources are appropriately included in the planning process.

== Next generation networks ==
The bandwidth needs of next generation services has placed added pressure on carriers to migrate from traditional networks like PSTN and TDMA to new Internet Protocol (IP)-based, or next generation networks, that can more adequately support the new services. Planning the transition to IP-based networks is a difficult endeavor in many respects. The capital expenditure (CAPEX) challenge of these new networks is that while it is remains expensive to make a mistake and deploy too much equipment (i.e., over-building their network and wasting assets), the non-linear relationship between bandwidth and network requirements means there are also significant costs from deploying too little (i.e., under-building the network and putting themselves at a higher chance of delivering poor quality of service and losing market share).

From a technical perspective, the new IP-based networks are also far more difficult to plan. The self-routing nature of IP networks requires planners to determine how the network will behave under normal, overloaded, and failure scenarios. The fact that IP can drop or delay packets during overload conditions introduces new complexity to the system. Interactive services such as voice, two-way video, and gaming are particularly susceptible to the resultant digital jitter and delay. Under these circumstances, the network planners need to know how these services will be affected under varying conditions. In addition, they need to know how the network can be configured to provide the best quality of service at the least cost.

The issue is further compounded by the fact that the simplicity of IP network operations comes from a more uniform, layered approach to network architecture. It’s the interaction between the layers of the network that creates significant complexity. For example, routine services can run on an IP (and/or Ethernet) network, while high-QoS services are assigned to special routes. These services ride on the underlying logical transport network (ring or mesh), which in turn rides on the underlying optical infrastructure. For planning teams, the effect of traffic on each layer must be taken into account in the other layers. This situation is made even more complex when reliability and disaster scenarios come into play, as backup resources must be made available at each layer in the hierarchy.

Traditionally, network planning was performed on a domain-by-domain (i.e., transport, access, etc.) and isolated basis. Network Resource Planning has adapted to address the shared-fabric nature of IP networks by integrating planning across domains. Network planners have a much more powerful tool in Network Resource Planning for leveraging all of the strengths of the various domains in comprehensive master plans. Over the next five years, the vast majority of tier-1 and -2 service providers are expected to shift to convergent network planning systems to handle the complexity of these networks, as well as reduce CAPEX and operational costs.
