= Tower of London test =

Neuropsychological test

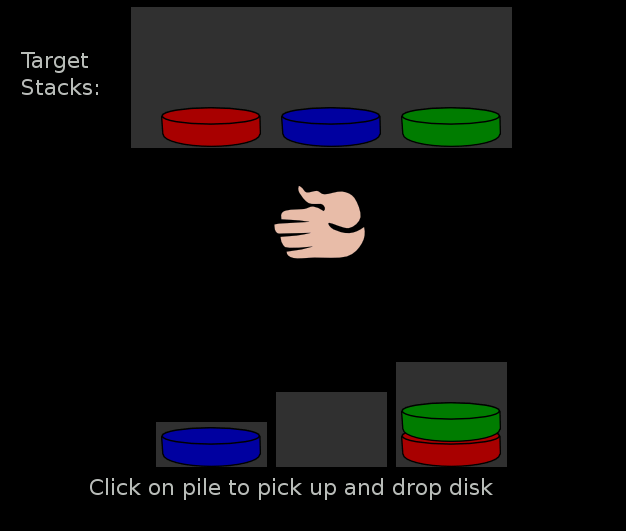
- Screenshot of the PEBL psychology software running the Tower of London test
- Purpose: assess executive function

The Tower of London test is a test used in applied clinical neuropsychology for the assessment of executive functioning specifically to detect deficits in planning, which may occur due to a variety of medical and neuropsychiatric conditions. It is related to the classic problem-solving puzzle known as the Tower of Hanoi.

The test was developed by the psychologist Tim Shallice.

== Test ==
The test consists of two boards with pegs and several beads with different colors. The examiner (usually a clinical psychologist or a neuropsychologist) presents the examinee with problem-solving tasks: one board shows the goal arrangement of beads, and the other board is given to the examinee with the beads in a different configuration. By moving beads from one peg to another, the examinee must alter the second board to match the first - a task that requires a degree of thinking ahead.

One common use of the test is for diagnosis of executive impairment. The performance of the examinee is compared to representative samples of individuals of the same age to derive hypotheses about the person's executive cognitive ability, especially as it may relate to brain damage. A certain degree of controversy surrounds the test's construct validity.

== Variants ==
Several variants of the test exist. Shallice's original test used three beads and pegs with different heights, although later researchers have generalized this to more beads without a peg height restriction. Versions of the test are available from a number of sources, including a stand-alone test by William Culbertson and Eric Zillmer (published by Drexel University) and a child/adolescent version that is part of the original NEPSY neuropsychological battery of tests by Marit Korkman, Ursula Kirk, and Sally Kemp (although removed from the second edition). A computerised variant, known as the Stockings of Cambridge test, is available as part of the Cambridge Neuropsychological Test Automated Battery (CANTAB).
