= Recurrent sequence =

In mathematics, recurrent sequence may refer to:

- A sequence satisfying a recurrence relation
- Recurrent word, a sequence such that any factor (consecutive subsequence) that appears does so infinitely often, such as the Thue–Morse sequence or a Sturmian word
