= Human knot =

Physical team-building activity

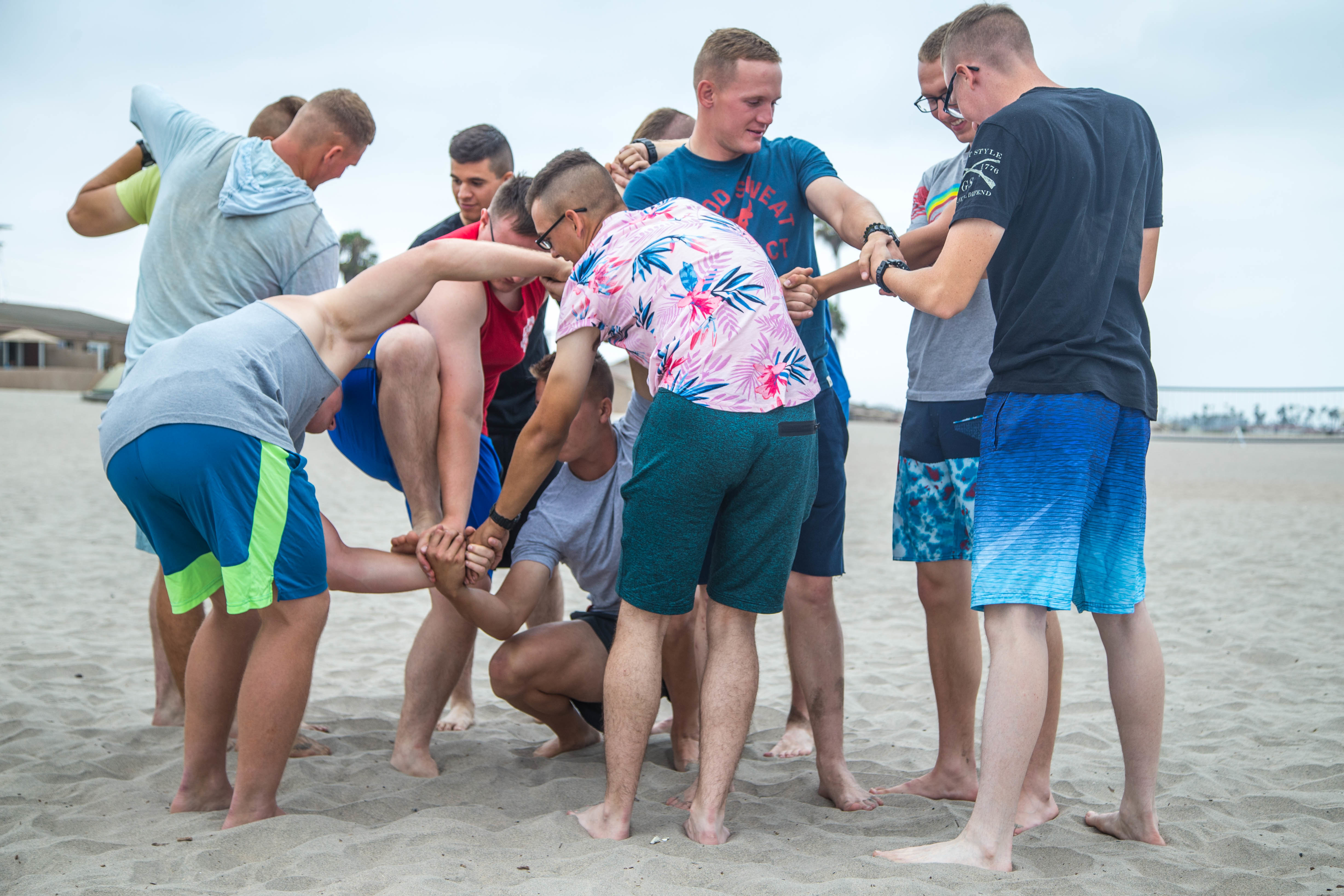
People solving a human knot puzzle

Some possible scenarios emerging in a human knot game: 1. / A solvable unknot; 2. / More than one ring; 3. / An unsolvable trefoil knot; 4. / An unsolvable figure-eight knot

A human knot is a common icebreaker game or team building activity for new people to learn to work together in physical proximity.

The knot is a disentanglement puzzle in which a group of people in a circle each hold hands with two people who are not next to them, and the goal is to disentangle the limbs to get the group into a circle, without letting go of grasped hands. Instead, group members should step over or under arms to try to untangle the knot. Not all human knots are solvable, as can be shown in knot theory (see unknotting problem), and can remain knots or may end up as two or more circles.

An easy way to ensure that the game will end up with a single circle with no nodes is to start from a circle of people holding each other hand, looking all towards the center of the circle, and ask some of them to cross their arms and swap their left hand with their right hand grasping again the same neighbor; this corresponds to a Reidemeister move and thus preserves the solvability of the knot. When the game is successfully completed a certain number of people will appear to be outside of the circle. This number equals the number of people having crossed arms. The challenge is to solve the game several times starting each time with an increasing number of crossed people. To increase the difficulty level, players can be blindfolded or required that the game be played silently (no talking).

The game is recommended for children from 18 years and up, and is best suited to a group of ten or so players, although it can be played with as few as five and with much larger groups as well. No materials are required. The purpose of the human knot puzzle is to gain team building skills, problem solving skills, and communication skills among a group of people and onto the individuals participating.
