= Kercang =

Disentanglement puzzle game from the Malay Peninsula

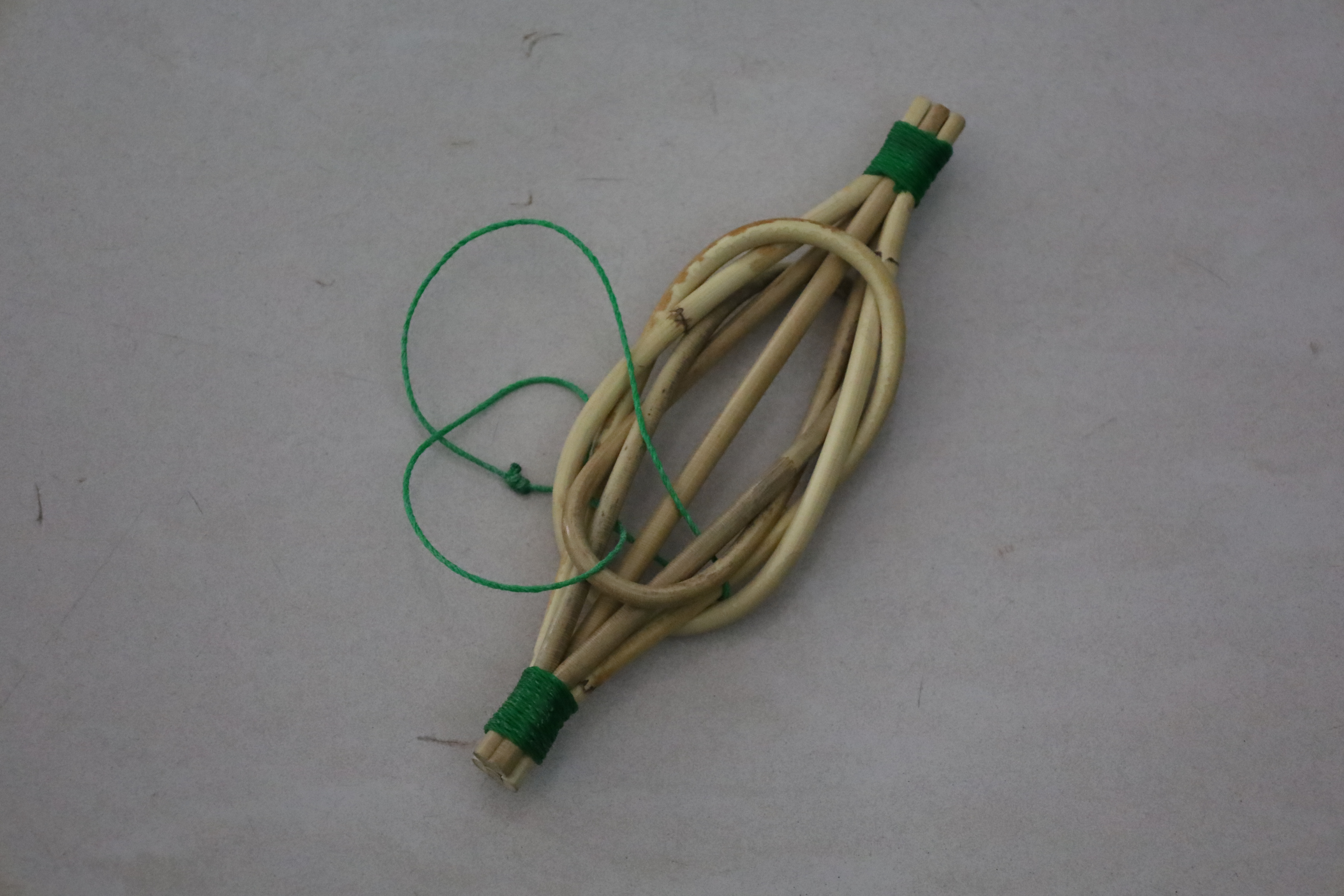
A kercang from the Jakun tribe in Endau, Malaysia.

Kercang (Jakun pronunciation: [kərˈt͡ʃaŋ]) (also known as chek reij nuej and buah latep) is a type of disentanglement puzzle game from the indigenous communities of the Malay Peninsula made using rattan and strings. The goal of the puzzle is to free the strings from a set of intertwined rattan wood, which is bent and twisted into many shapes and forms based on the difficulty of the puzzle.

== History & cultural significance ==
The kercang originated from the Jakun tribe around present-day Johor, however, it has made its way spreading across different indigenous communities in the region. The word literally means 'game' in the Jakun language.

The physical object was originally used as a compass for those lost in the forest, before being turned into a puzzle. Its build as a puzzle, symbolises this concept, being made of wood, twisted around like the path in a forest.

According to the Jakun folklore, the game was created when an old man was trapped in a forest by a forest spirit. Believing he was just lost, he made the tool to help him leave, but was unsuccessful. When he found that it was the doing of the forest spirit, he threw the kercang to the spirit, which led the spirit to play with the kercang, trying to get the string out of the rattan. As a result, the spirit became distracted, and the man was able to escape and return to his village.

To this day, kercang remains significant in the indigenous cultures, with some of the forms having specific purposes of usage. The kahwin type, for example, is used by the Jakun people to test a prospective child-in-law's intellectual ability before letting them marry in, by successfully bringing the two rings onto the same side of a bamboo stick. It is especially important for when two persons have proposed to marry in, and so the first to solve the puzzle will be chosen as the child-in-law. Similarly, if the married couple wishes to divorce, they both need to separate the rings and put on opposite sides once again.

It is also important for the mental and intellectual development of the indigenous children, and has been used as part of their informal education.

== Types of kercang ==
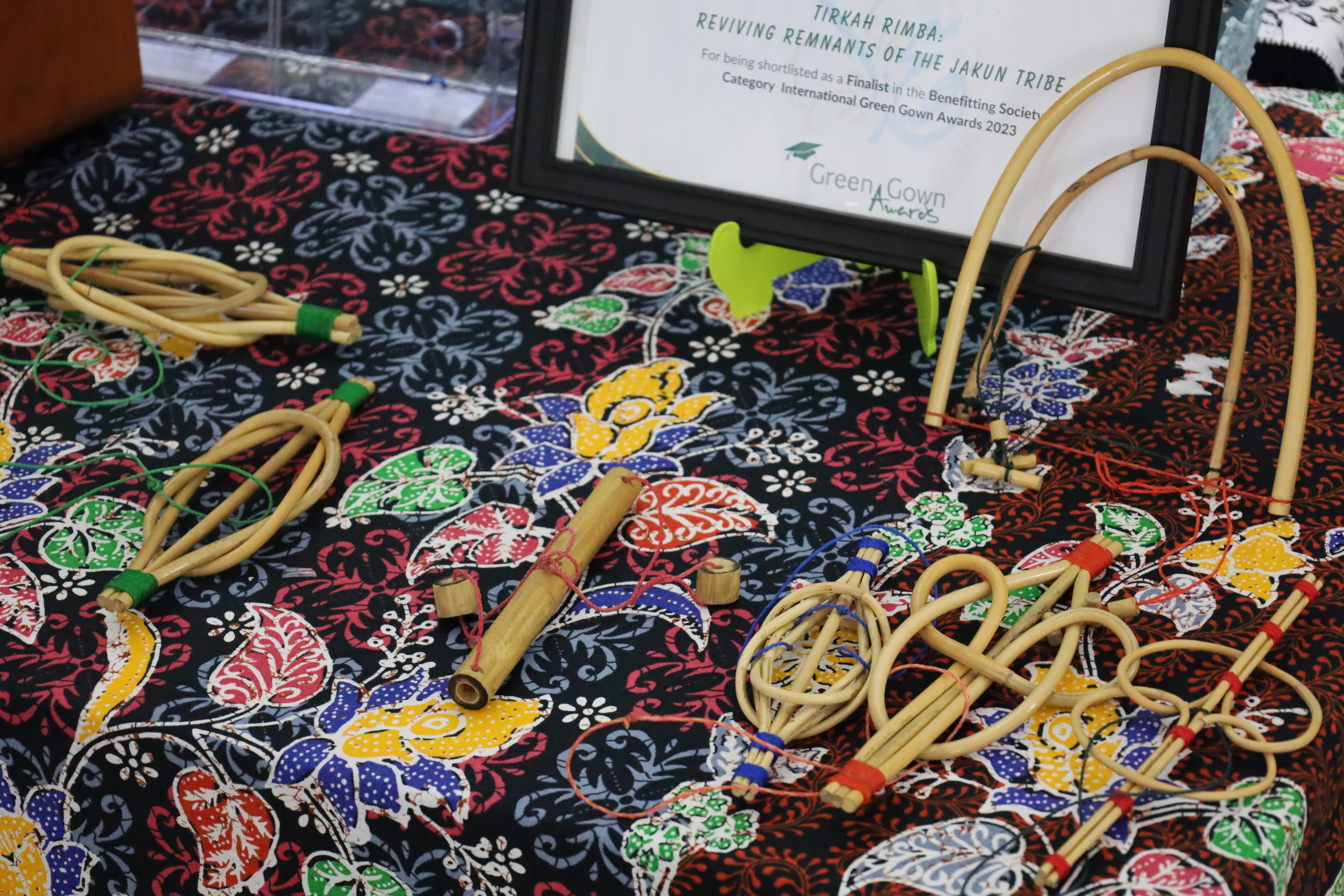
Various types of kercang on display at an exhibition.

There are various popular forms of kecang with their own names:

- Kercang kahwin (marriage kercang) involves two rings on a piece of string being on opposite sides of a bamboo stick, and used for marriage.
- Kercang gunting (scissor kercang) is charactised by its shape that is similar to a pair of scissors.
- Kercang pasung was used to determine whether a person blamed for a wrongdoing was guilty or not. If they succeed in solving the puzzle, they will be considered innocent.
- Kercang tipah tertipu (fooled tipah kercang) is often initially seen as the easiest due to its simple build, but ends up being among the hardest, requiring an out-of-the-box approach.
- Kercang wau (kite kercang) is solvable in seven steps.
