= Sesquipower =

Topic in combinatorics

In mathematics, a sesquipower or Zimin word is a string over an alphabet with identical prefix and suffix. Sesquipowers are unavoidable patterns, in the sense that all sufficiently long strings contain one.

== Formal definition ==
Formally, let A be an alphabet and A^{∗} be the free monoid of finite strings over A. Every non-empty word w in A^{+} is a sesquipower of order 1. If u is a sesquipower of order n then any word w = uvu is a sesquipower of order n + 1. The degree of a non-empty word w is the largest integer d such that w is a sesquipower of order d.

== Bi-ideal sequence ==
A bi-ideal sequence is a sequence of words f_{i} where f_{1} is in A^{+} and
$$f_{i+1} = f_i g_i f_i \$$
for some g_{i} in A^{∗} and i ≥ 1. The degree of a word w is thus the length of the longest bi-ideal sequence ending in w.

== Unavoidable patterns ==
For a finite alphabet A on k letters, there is an integer M depending on k and n, such that any word of length M has a factor which is a sesquipower of order at least n. We express this by saying that the sesquipowers are unavoidable patterns.

== Sesquipowers in infinite sequences ==
Given an infinite bi-ideal sequence, we note that each f_{i} is a prefix of f_{i+1} and so the f_{i} converge to an infinite sequence
$$f = f_1 g_1 f_1 g_2 f_1 g_1 f_1 g_3 f_1 \cdots \$$

We define an infinite word to be a sesquipower if it is the limit of an infinite bi-ideal sequence. An infinite word is a sesquipower if and only if it is a recurrent word, that is, every factor occurs infinitely often.

Fix a finite alphabet A and assume a total order on the letters. For given integers p and n, every sufficiently long word in A^{∗} has either a factor which is a p-power or a factor which is an n-sesquipower; in the latter case the factor has an n-factorisation into Lyndon words.

== See also ==
- ABACABA pattern
