= Disentanglement puzzle =

Simple mechanical puzzles using topology

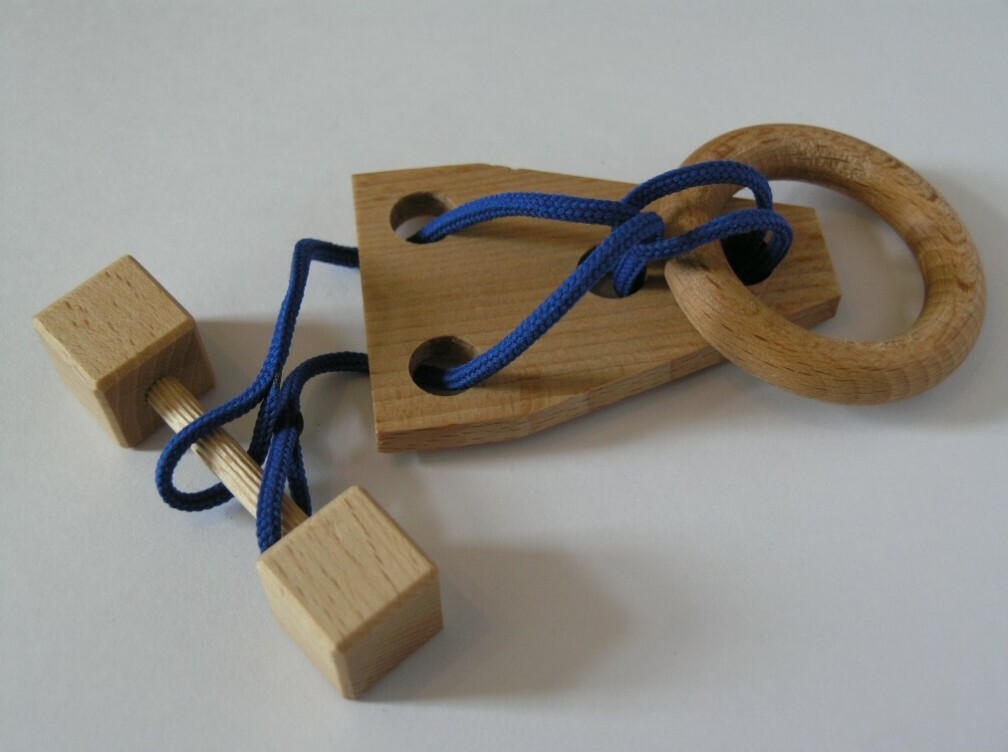
A disentanglement puzzle

Disentanglement puzzles (also called entanglement puzzles, tanglement puzzles, or topological puzzles) are a type or group of mechanical puzzle that involves disentangling one piece or set of pieces from another piece or set of pieces. Several subtypes are included under this category, the names of which are sometimes used synonymously for the group: wire puzzles; nail puzzles; ring-and-string puzzles; et al. Although the initial object is disentanglement, the reverse problem of reassembling the puzzle can be as hard as—or even harder than—disentanglement. There are several different kinds of disentanglement puzzles, though a single puzzle may incorporate several of these features. Tavern Puzzles are included in this group; however, Tavern Puzzle is a brand name, not a generic term.

== Wire-and-string puzzles ==
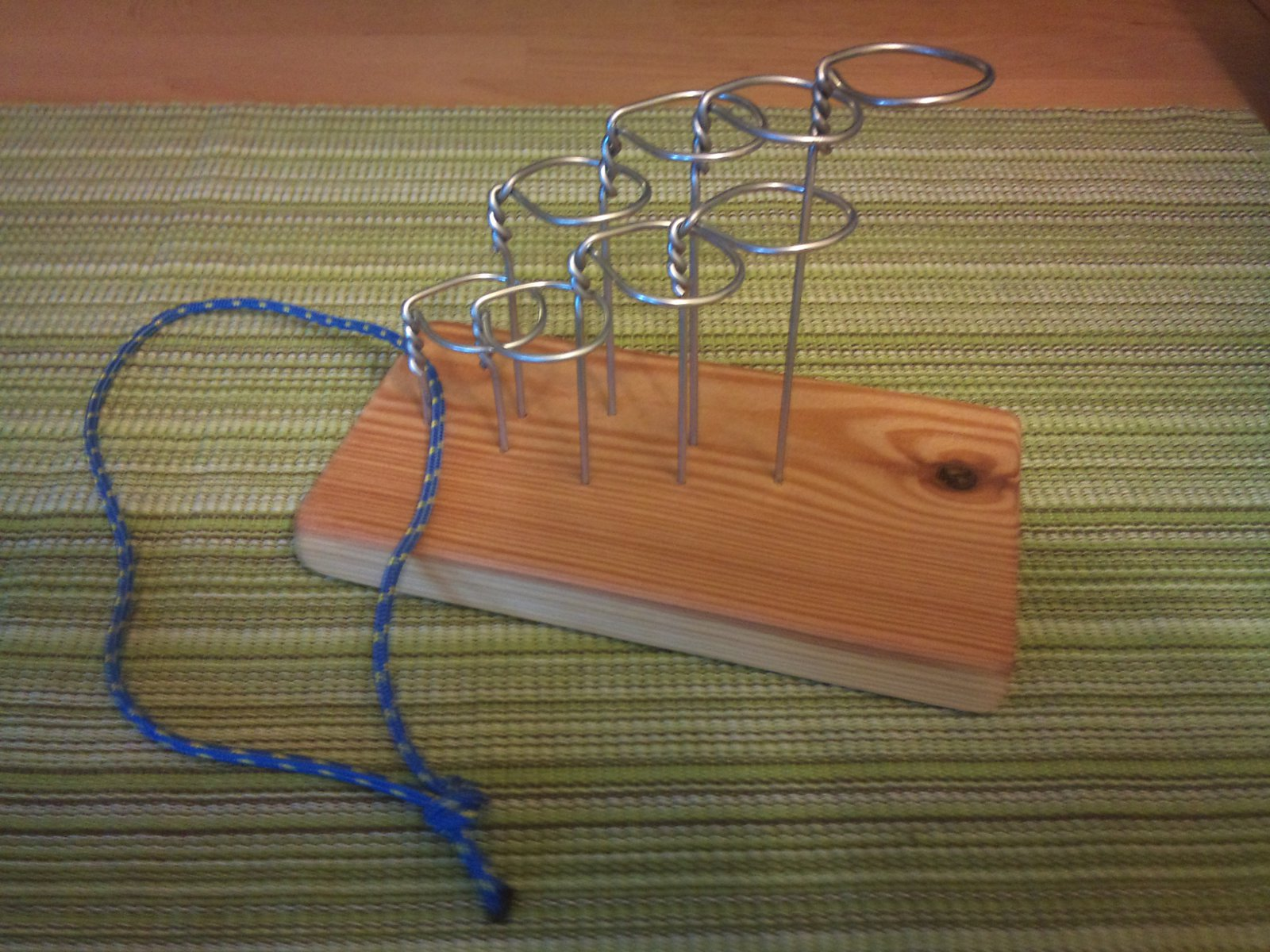
A complex Baguenaudier puzzle. The goal is to free the string.

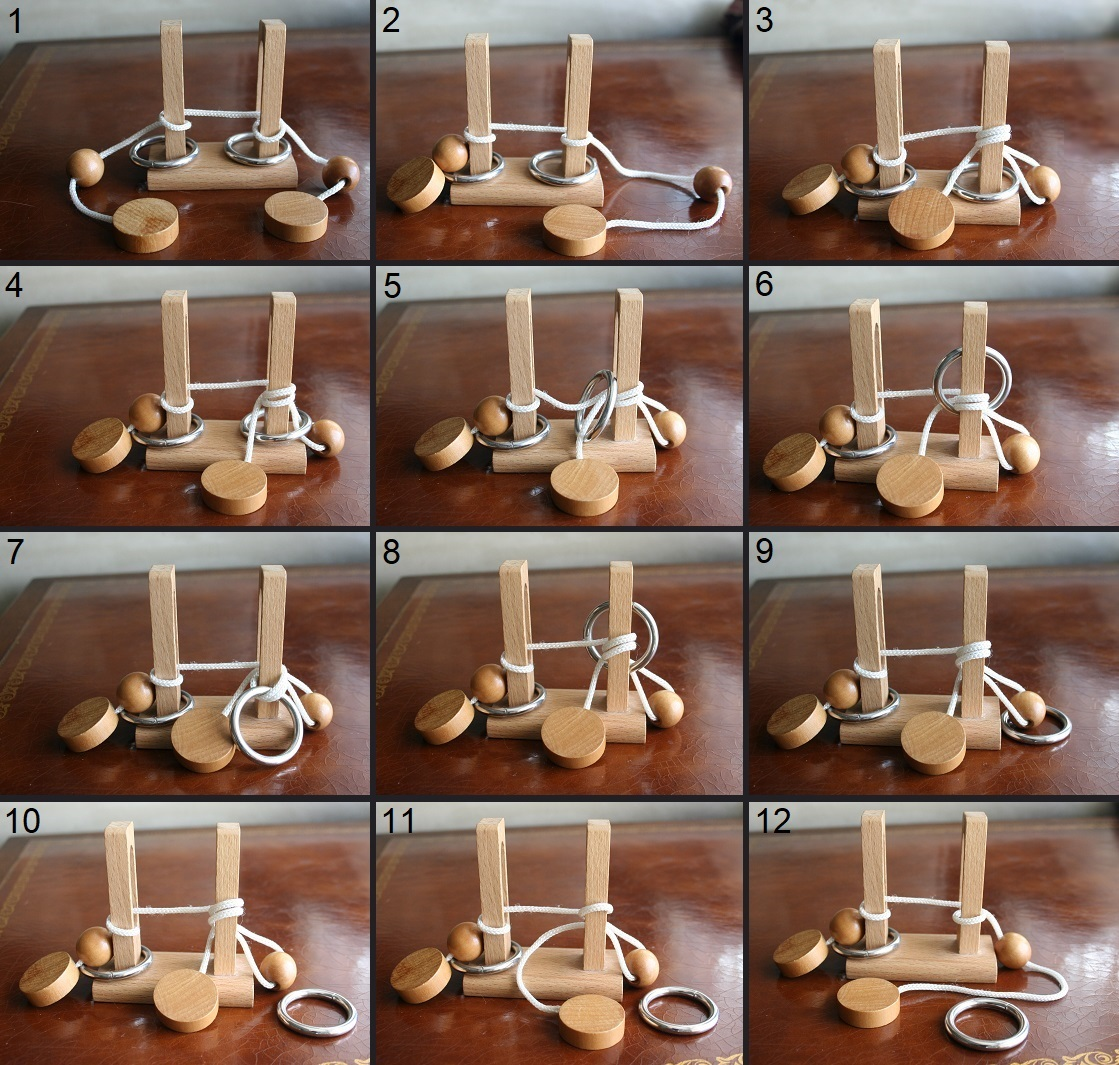
The "mini rope bridge puzzle". The goal is to remove the two rings. (solution shown).

Wire-and-string puzzles usually consist of:

- one piece of string, ribbon or similar, which may form a closed loop or which may have other pieces like balls fixed to its end.
- one or several pieces of stiff wire
- sometimes additional pieces like wooden ball through which the string is threaded.

One can distinguish three subgroups of wire-and-string puzzles:

- Closed string subgroup: The pieces of string consist of one closed loop, as in the Baguenaudier puzzle. Usually the string has to be disentangled from the wire.
- Unclosed loose string subgroup: The pieces of string are not closed, and are not attached to the wire. In this case the ends of the string are fitted with a ball, cube or similar which stops the string from slipping out too easily. Usually the string has to be disentangled from the wire. Sometimes other tasks have to be completed instead, such as shifting a ring or ball from one end of the string to another end.
- Unclosed fixed string subgroup: The pieces of string are not closed, but are somewhere on its length attached to the wire. In these puzzles the string is not to be disentangled from the wire. One possible task may be to shift a ring or ball from one end of the string to another end.

One particularly difficult puzzle was designed by R. Boomhower in 1966 and has been modified into different designs (but topologically similar). Different versions include a paddle-shaped design, a vertical beam on a wood support, and two vertical beams on a wood support. Variations also have the string passing through the slot once or two times. Names have included the Boomhower puzzle, T-Bar puzzle, Wit's End puzzle, and the Mini Rope Bridge puzzle. Some sources identify a topologically-equivalent puzzle called the Mystery Key issued by the Peter Pan company in the 1950s.

== Wire puzzles ==
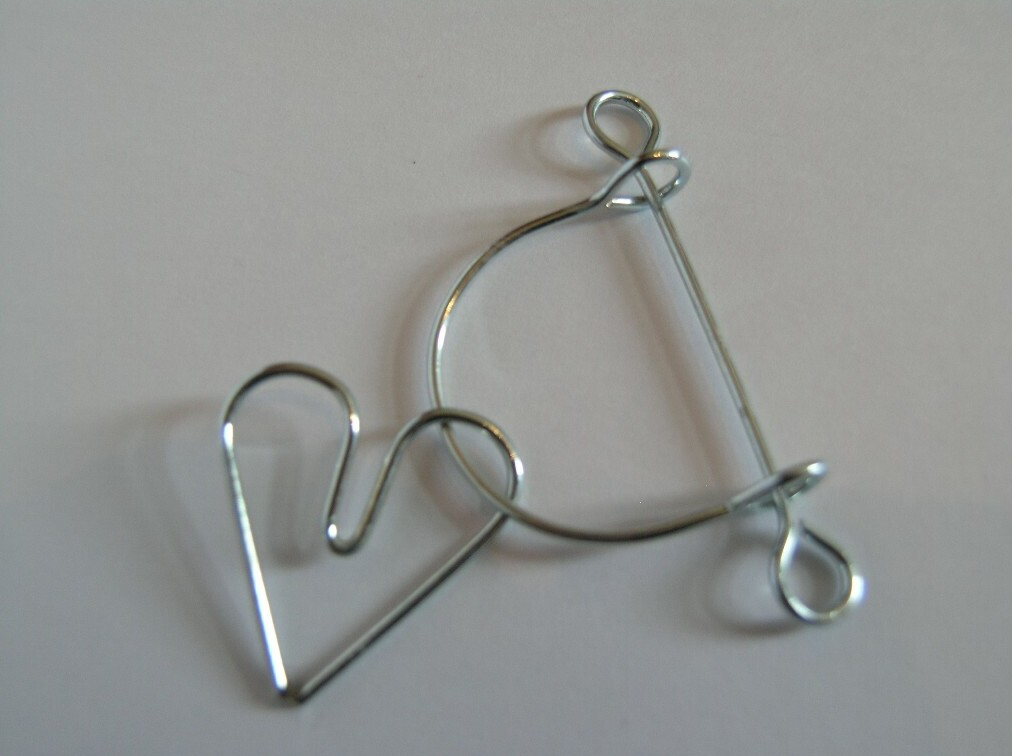
A wire puzzle

Wire puzzles, or nail puzzles consist of two or more entangled pieces of more or less stiff wire, metal rods, or bent nails. The pieces may or may not be closed loops. The closed pieces might be simple rings or have more complex shapes. Normally the puzzle must be solved by disentangling the two pieces without bending or cutting the wires.

Early wire puzzles were made from bent carpenter's nails, horseshoes, or similar material.

== Plate-and-ring puzzles ==
A plate-and-ring puzzle usually consists of three pieces:

- one plate or similar displaying many holes and/or indentations
- a closed or nearly closed ring or a similar item.

The plate as well as the ring are usually made from metal. The ring has to be disentangled from the plate.

== Puzzles with no solution ==
Some puzzles have been created which may appear deceptively simple, but are actually impossible to solve. One such puzzle is the "Notorious Figure Eight Puzzle" (also called the "Figure Eight Puzzle, or "Possibly Impossible"). It is sometimes sold with instructions giving hints as to its level of difficulty, and a "solution" is provided but is vague and impossible to follow, but the puzzle is actually impossible to solve.

== Mathematical modeling ==
Most puzzle solvers try to solve such puzzles by mechanical manipulation, but some branches of mathematics can be used to create a model of disentanglement puzzles. Applying a configuration space with a topological framework is an analytical method to gain insight into the properties and solution of some disentanglement puzzles. However, some mathematicians have stated that capturing the important aspects of many such puzzles can often be difficult, and there is no universal algorithm that will provide the solution generally to such puzzles.

== See also ==
- Borromean rings, a method of linking three closed loops which is found in some disentanglement puzzles
- Kercang, a traditional disentanglement puzzle by the Jakun indigenous tribe in Malaysia
- Human knot
- Tangloids
- Unknotting problem
- Unlink
