= ABACABA pattern =

Mathematical fractal pattern

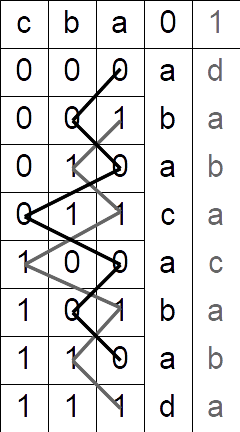
DABACABA patterns in (3-bit) binary numbers

The ABACABA pattern is a fractal pattern that shows up in many places in the real world (such as in geometry, art, music, poetry, number systems, literature and higher dimensions). Patterns often show a DABACABA type subset. AA, ABBA, and ABAABA type forms are also considered.

== Generating the pattern ==
In order to generate the next sequence, first take the previous pattern, add the next letter from the alphabet, and then repeat the previous pattern. The first few steps are listed here.

Step	Pattern	Letters
1	A	2^{1} − 1 = 1
2	ABA	3
3	ABACABA	7
4	ABACABADABACABA	15
5	ABACABADABACABAEABACABADABACABA	31
6	ABACABADABACABAEABACABADABACABAFABACABADABACABAEABACABADABACABA	63

ABACABA is a "quickly growing word", often described as chiastic or "symmetrically organized around a central axis" (see: Chiastic structure and Χ). The number of members in each iteration is a(n) = 2^{n} − 1, the Mersenne numbers ((sequence A000225 in the OEIS)). Replacing each letter with their respective numbers yields the ruler function.

== Gallery ==
Sierpinski triangle:
ABACABA

Ruler, excluding 1 and 2:
ABACABADABACABA
excluding 2:
EABACABADABACABA

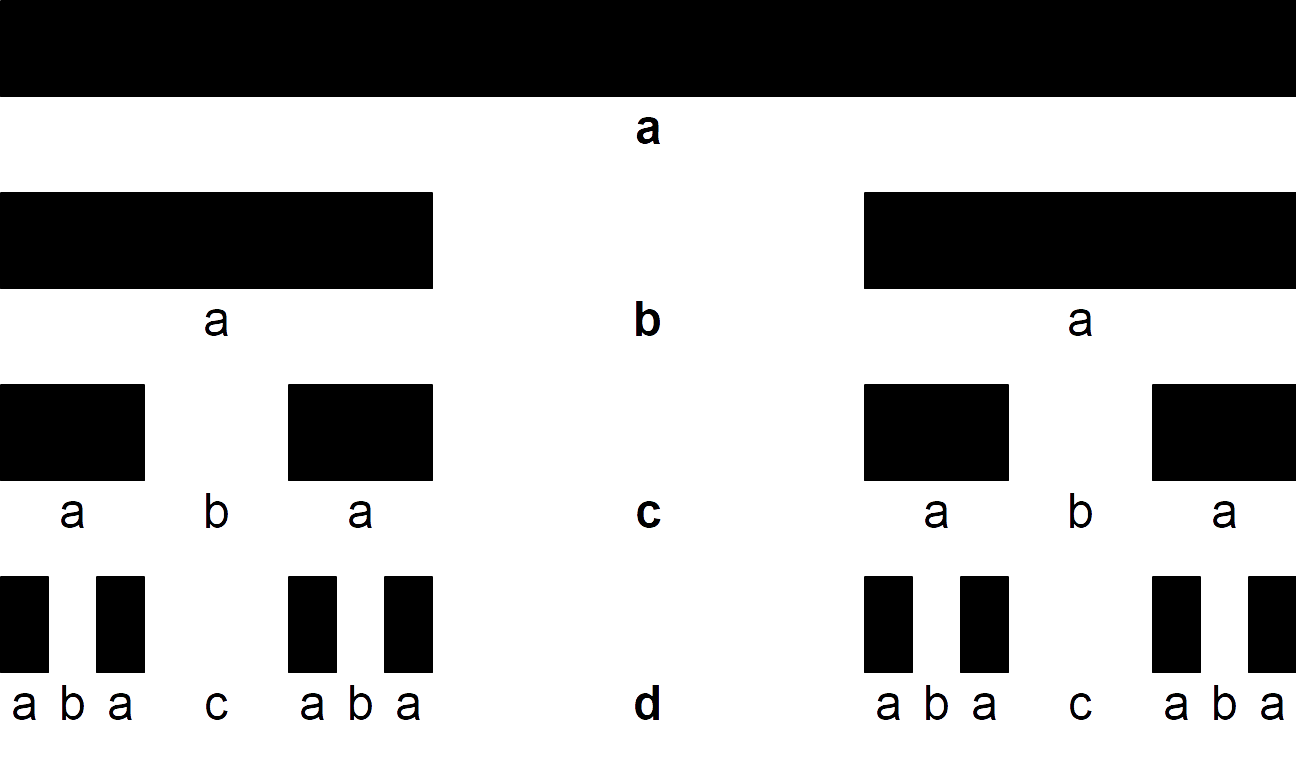
Cantor set:
ABACABADABACABA

Binary tree/upside down family tree:
ABACABADABACABA

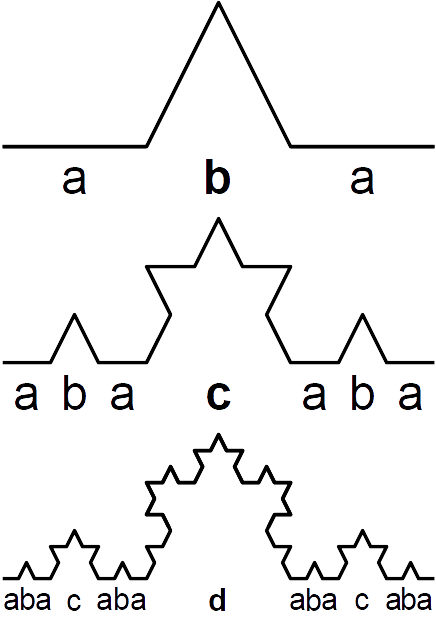
Koch curve: $n=1$ is ABA, $n=2$ is ABACABA, and $n=3$: ABACABADABACABA

Metric hierarchy:
ABACABADABACABA (Note: The strength, emphasis, or importance of the beginning of each duration $1/8$ the length of a single measure in 4/4 (eighth-notes) is, divisively ($2/2^1=1$, $4/2^2=1$, $8/2^3=1$), determined by each eighth-note's position in a DABACABA structure, while the eighth notes of two measures grouped, additively ($8\times2=16$), are determined by an EABACABADABACABA structure.)

Metric levels:
EABACABADABACABA

When counting in binary (here 4-bit), the final 0s form an ABACABA pattern

A staircase with each box double the size of the previous one:
ABACABADABACABA

A "circle fractal" superimposed with a 2 × 2 box fractal:
ABACABADABACABA

The Tower of Hanoi with four disks:
ABACABADABACABA

Binary tree array:
ABACABADABACABA

Binary-reflected Gray code (BRGC):
to G

Rotary encoder:
to I

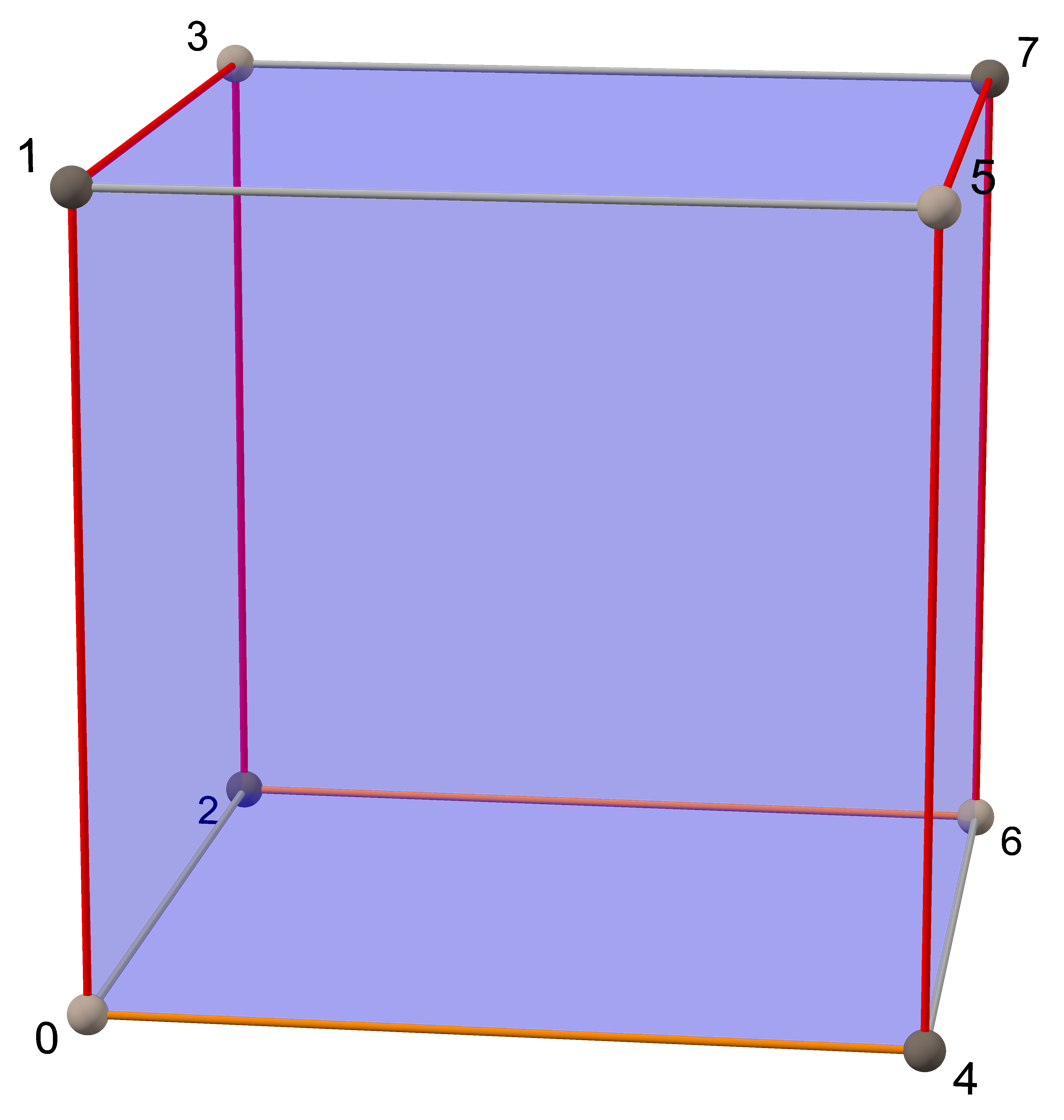
3-bit Gray code visualized as a traversal of vertices of a cube (0,1,3,2,6,7,5,4):
ABACABA

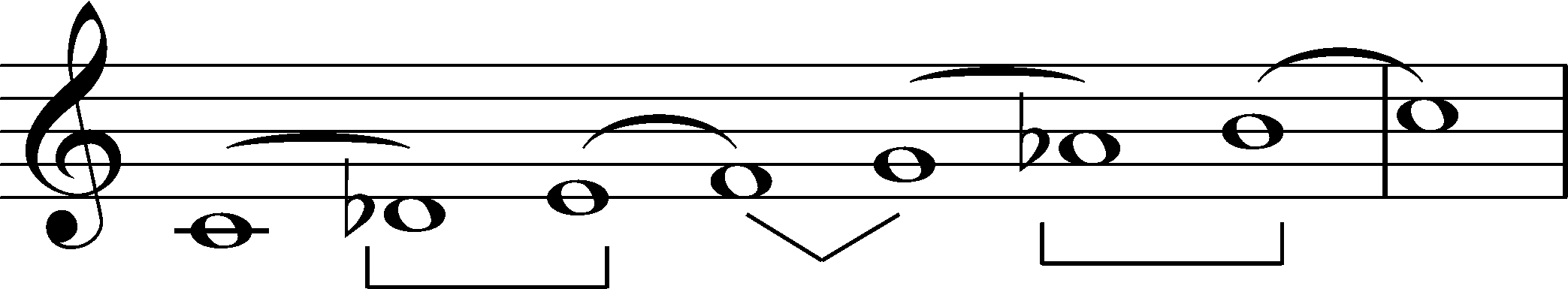
Double harmonic scale with steps of H-3H-H-W-H-3H-H:
ABACABA

Gray code along the number line ((sequence A003188 in the OEIS)):
ABACABADABACABAEABACABADABACABA

Devil's needle:
ABACABADABACABA

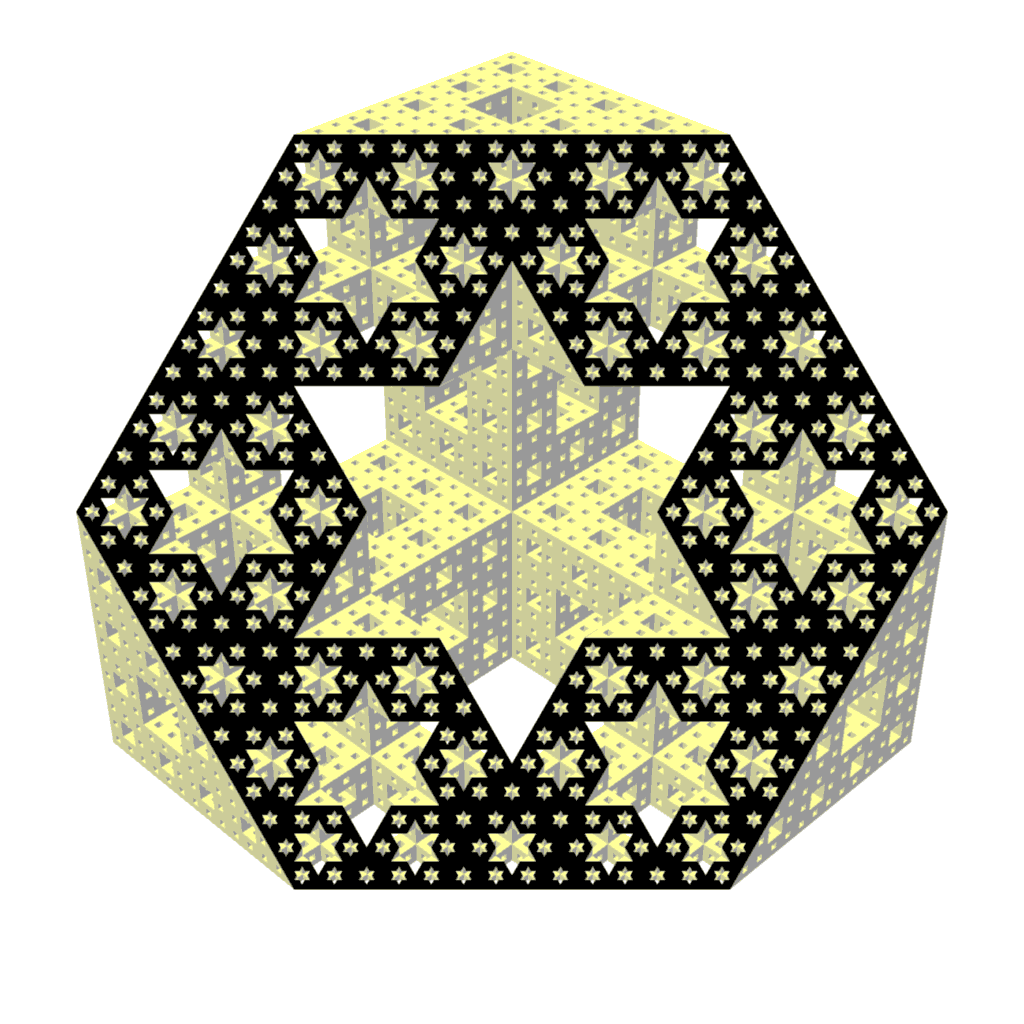
Size of hexagrams on a diagonal of a section of a Menger sponge model:
ABACABADABACABA

== See also ==
- Arch form
- Farey sequence
- Sesquipower
