= Chiastic structure =

Chiastic structure, or chiastic pattern, is a literary technique in narrative motifs and other textual passages. An example of chiastic structure would be two ideas, A and B, together with variants A' and B', being presented as A,B,B',A'. Chiastic structures that involve more components are sometimes called "ring structures" or "ring compositions". These may be regarded as chiasmus scaled up from words and clauses to larger segments of text.

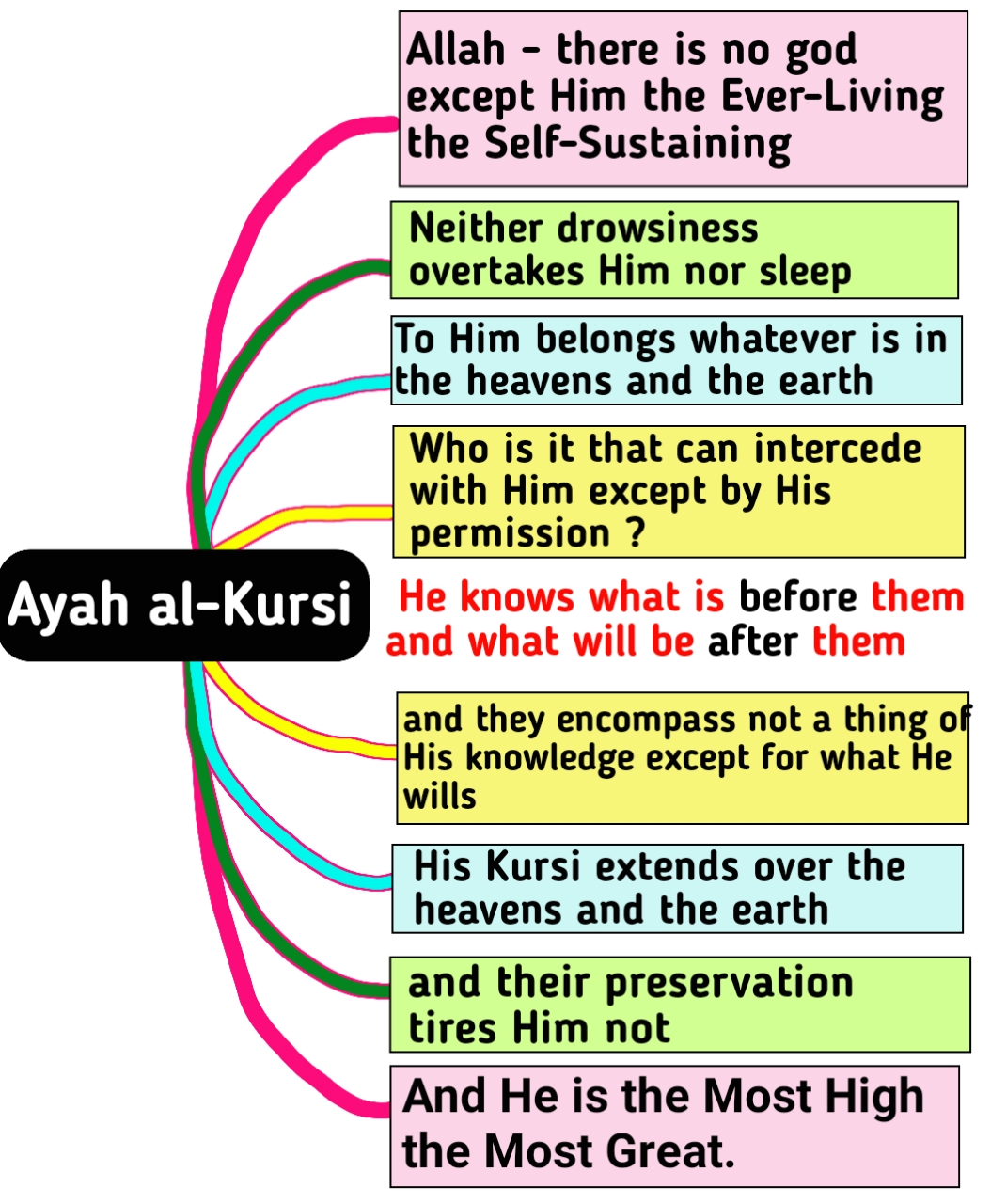
Example of a ring structure in the Quran

These often symmetrical patterns are commonly found in ancient literature such as the epic poetry of the Iliad and the Odyssey. Classicist Bruno Gentili describes this technique as "the cyclical, circular, or 'ring' pattern (ring composition). Here the idea that introduced a compositional section is repeated at its conclusion, so that the whole passage is framed by material of identical content". Meanwhile, in classical prose, scholars often find chiastic narrative techniques in the Histories of Herodotus:

Herodotus frequently uses ring composition or 'epic regression' as a way of supplying background information for something discussed in the narrative. First an event is mentioned briefly, then its precedents are reviewed in reverse chronological order as far back as necessary; at that point the narrative reverses itself and moves forward in chronological order until the event in the main narrative line is reached again.

Various chiastic structures are also seen in the Hebrew Bible, the New Testament, the Book of Mormon, and the Quran.

== Etymology ==
When read left to right, top to bottom, the first topic (A) is reiterated as the last, and the middle concept (B) appears twice in succession. (Also, the middle concept could appear just once.)

The term chiastic derives from the mid-17th century term chiasmus, which refers to a crosswise arrangement of concepts or words that are repeated in reverse order. Chiasmus derives from the Greek word khiasmos, which in turn derives from khiazein, meaning mark with the letter chi, from khi, meaning chi.

Chi is made up of two lines crossing each other as in the shape of an X. The line that starts leftmost on top, comes down, and is rightmost on the bottom, and vice versa. If one thinks of the lines as concepts, one sees that concept A, which comes first, is also last, and concept B, which comes after A, comes before A. If one adds in more lines representing other concepts, one gets a chiastic structure with more concepts. (Note: See Proverbs 1:20-33: verses 20-21=A, verse 22=B, verse 23=C, verses 24-25=D, verses 26-28=E, verses 29-30=D', verse 31=C', verse 32=B', verse 33=A'.)

== Mnemonic device ==
Oral literature is especially rich in chiastic structure, possibly as an aid to memorization and oral performance. In Homer's Iliad and Odyssey, for instance, Cedric Whitman finds chiastic patterns "of the most amazing virtuosity" that simultaneously perform both aesthetic and mnemonic functions, permitting the oral poet easily to recall the basic structure of the composition during performances. Steve Reece has demonstrated several ambitious ring compositions in Homer's Odyssey and compared their aesthetic and mnemonic functions with those of several South Slavic songs.

== Use in the Hebrew Bible ==
Chiasms in the Hebrew Bible include, but are not limited to, the following examples:

- Genesis 6:10–9:18a (including a numerical mini-chiasm)
- Genesis 17:1–25
- Genesis 32:1–31 (including a name-changing mini-chiasm)
- Genesis 37:3–11
- Genesis 37:12–36
- Genesis 38:1–30
- Genesis 39:1–23
- Genesis 40:1–23
- Genesis 41:1–57
- Genesis 42:1–38

=== Genesis flood narrative ===
Gordon Wenham (1978) analyzed the Genesis flood narrative and concluded that it is essentially an elaborate chiasm. Based on the earlier study of grammatical structure by F. I. Andersen (1974), Wenham illustrated a chiastic structure as displayed in the following two tables.

Chiastic structure of the Genesis flood narrative
A: Noah and his sons (Gen 6:10)

B: All life on earth (6:13:a)

C: Curse on earth (6:13:b)

D: Flood announced (6:7)

E: Ark (6:14-16)

F: All living creatures (6:17–20 )

G: Food (6:21)

H: Animals in man's hands (7:2–3)

I: Entering the Ark (7:13–16)

J: Waters increase (7:17–20)

X: God remembers Noah (8:1)

J': Waters decrease (8:13–14)

I': Exiting the Ark (8:15–19)

H': Animals (9:2,3)

G': Food (9:3,4)

F': All living creatures (9:10a)

E': Ark (9:10b)

D': No flood in future (9:11)

C': Blessing on earth (9:12–17)

B': All life on earth (9:16)

A': Noah and his sons (9:18,19a)

Within this overall structure, there is a numerical mini-chiasm of 7s, 40s, and 150s:

Chiasm of the numbers 7, 40, and 150
α: Seven days waiting to enter Ark (7:4)

β: Second mention of seven days waiting (7:10)

γ: 40 days (7:17)

δ: 150 days (7:24)

χ: God remembers Noah (8:1)

δ': 150 days (8:3)

γ': 40 days (8:6)

β': Seven days waiting for dove (8:10)

α': Second seven days waiting for dove (8:12)

=== Genesis 17 ===
William Ramey has compiled several chiasms in the Hebrew Bible, including Genesis 17:1–25 (quoted in Donald Ostrowski 2006).

Chiastic structure of Genesis 17:1–25
A: Abram's age ("When Abram was 99 years old..."; 1a)

B: God appears before Abram (1b)

C: God's first speech (1b–2)

D: Abram falls on his face (3)

E: God's second speech (Abram's name changed, "nations from you and kings"; 4–8)

X: God's third speech (the covenant of circumcision; 9–14)

E': God's fourth speech (Sarai's name changed to Sarah, "mother of nations, kings"; 15–16)

D': Abraham falls on his face (17–18)

C': God's fifth speech (19–21)

B': God "goes up" from Abraham (22)

A': Abraham's age ("Abraham was 99 years old..."; 24–25)

=== Book of Daniel ===
In 1986, William H. Shea proposed that the Book of Daniel is composed of a double-chiasm. He argued that the chiastic structure is emphasized by the two languages that the book is written in: Aramaic and Hebrew. The first chiasm is written in Aramaic from chapters 2-7 following an ABC...CBA pattern. The second chiasm is in Hebrew from chapters 8–12, also using the ABC...CBA pattern. However, Shea represents Daniel 9:26 as "D", a break in the center of the pattern.

== Use in the Christian New Testament ==
Form critic Nils Lund acknowledged Jewish and classical patterns of writing in the New Testament, including the use of chiastic structures throughout.

== Use in the Quran ==
While there are many examples of chiastic structure in the Quran, perhaps the most well known is in the 'Verse of the Throne' or 'Ayat al-Kursi'. The verse contains 9 sentences which exhibit chiasmus, but perhaps more interesting is that it is found in the longest chapter of the Quran, Al-Baqara, which itself contains a fractal chiastic structure in its 286 verses, i.e. where each (outer) chiasm is composed of (inner) chiastic structures reflected in some sense in the analogue outer chiasm. One such analysis of the chapter is shown below (from; alternate and/or more detail analyses can be found in,).

Chiastic structure of Sura 2: The Cow
A: Belief (1-20)

Aa: Believers (1-5)
Ab: Unbelievers (6-20)

B: God's creation and knowledge (21-39)

Ba: Evidence of God: Life and death, bringing the dead back to life (28)
Bb: God knows all (29-30, 32-33)

C: Early prophets and books (40-103)

Ca: God gave Moses the Book (43, 87)
Cb: Solomon, son of David (102)

D: Trials (104-152)

Da: Abraham tested by God (124)
Db: Abraham and Ishmael built Ka'ba (127)
Dc: Concealing testimony (140)
Dd: People of the book (Jews and Christians) say... (111, 113, 116, 118, 135)

D': Trials (153-177)

Da': Muslims will be tested (155)
Db': Pilgrimage to the Ka'ba (158)
Dc': Concealing God's signs and revelations (159, 174)
Dd': Polytheists say... (167, 170)

C': Early prophets and books (178-253)

Ca': It has been written (prescribed) for you (178, 180, 183, 216)
Cb': David, father of Solomon (251)

B': God's creation and knowledge (254-284)

Ba': Evidence of God: Life and death, bringing the dead back to life (258-260)
Bb': God knows all (255-256,261,268,270-271,273,282-284)

A': Belief (285-286)

Aa': Believers (285)
Ab': Unbelievers (286)

== Use in the Primary Chronicle ==
Donald Ostrowski (2006) identified two chiastic structures within the Primary Chronicle (PVL) account of Volodimer's conversion.

Chiastic structure of the "Examination of Religions" (story 1 and story 2)
A: 'Foreign missionaries come to Volodimer in Kyiv to tell about their respective religions'

B: 'Volodimer decides to wait a little so he can find out about all religions'

X: 'Volodimer calls boyars and elders to find out what he should do'

B': 'Volodimer is advised to send envoys to find out about each religion'

A': 'Volodimer sends envoys out to report on the religions of the people they visit'

Chiastic structure of the "Kherson Legend" (story 3 and story 4)
A: 'Volodimer vows to be baptized if he is successful in capturing Kherson'

B: Volodimer takes Kherson but is not baptized'

C: 'Volodimer demands marriage to Anna, sister of the Byzantine co-emperors'

D: 'The Emperors agree in principle to send Anna'

E: 'The Emperors propose that Volodimer be baptized first'

X: 'Volodimer's counterproposal to be baptized by Anna's priests'

E': 'The Emperors agree to Volodimer's counterproposal'

D': 'The Emperors send Anna to Kherson'

C': 'Anna arrives in Kherson to be married to Volodimer'

B': 'Volodimer's blindness related'

A': 'Volodimer is baptized on Anna's instruction and regains his sight'

== Use in the Book of Mormon ==
Chiastic structure is found throughout the Book of Mormon, for example in Mosiah 5:8–9:

Chiastic structure of Mosiah 5:8–9
And under this head ye are made free, and there is no other head whereby ye can be made free.

A There is no other name given whereby salvation cometh;

B therefore, I would that ye should take upon you the name of Christ,

C all you that have entered into the covenant with God

D that ye should be obedient unto the end of your lives.
D And it shall come to pass that whosoever doeth this

C shall be found at the right hand of God,

B for he shall know the name by which he is called;

A for he shall be called by the name of Christ.

== ABC…CBA pattern ==
=== Beowulf ===
In literary texts with a possible oral origin, such as Beowulf, chiastic or ring structures are often found on an intermediate level, that is, between the (verbal and/or grammatical) level of chiasmus and the higher level of chiastic structure such as noted in the Torah. John D. Niles provides examples of chiastic figures on all three levels. He notes that for the instances of ll. 12–19, the announcement of the birth of (Danish) Beowulf, are chiastic, more or less on the verbal level, that of chiasmus. Then, each of the three main fights are organized chiastically, a chiastic structure on the level of verse paragraphs and shorter passages. For instance, the simplest of these three, the fight with Grendel, is schematized as follows:

A: Preliminaries

- Grendel approaching
- Grendel rejoicing
- Grendel devouring Handscioh

B: Grendel's wish to flee ("fingers cracked")

C: Uproar in hall; Danes stricken with terror

HEOROT IN DANGER OF FALLING

C': Uproar in hall; Danes stricken with terror

B': "Joints burst"; Grendel forced to flee

A': Aftermath

- Grendel slinking back toward fens
- Beowulf rejoicing
- Beowulf left with Grendel's arm

Finally, Niles provides a diagram of the highest level of chiastic structure, the organization of the poem as a whole, in an introduction, three major fights with interludes before and after the second fight (with Grendel's mother), and an epilogue. To illustrate, he analyzes Prologue and Epilogue as follows:

Prologue
A: Panegyric for Scyld

B: Scyld's funeral

C: History of Danes before Hrothgar

D: Hrothgar's order to build Heorot

Epilogue

D': Beowulf's order to build his barrow

C': History of Geats after Beowulf ("messenger's prophecy")

B': Beowulf's funeral

A': Eulogy for Beowulf

=== Paradise Lost ===
The overall chiastic structure of John Milton's Paradise Lost is also of the ABC...CBA type:

A: Satan's sinful actions (Books 1–3)

B: Entry into Paradise (Book 4)

C: War in heaven (destruction) (Books 5–6)
C': Creation of the world (Books 7–8)

B': Loss of paradise (Book 9)

A': Humankind's sinful actions (Books 10–12)

== See also ==
- ABACABA pattern
- Antimetabole
- Arch form
- Book of Esther
- Chiasmus
- Cloud Atlas (novel)

== Sources ==
- Garrett, Duane A. (1993). Proverbs, Ecclesiastes, Song of songs. The New American Commentary, v. 14. Nashville, Tennessee: Broadman Press. ISBN 978-0-8054-0114-1. OCLC 27895425.
- Niles, John D. (1979). "Ring Composition and the Structure of Beowulf". PMLA. 94 (5): 924–35. doi:10.2307/461974. JSTOR 461974. S2CID 163316481.
- Ostrowski, Donald (2006). "The Account of Volodimer's Conversion in the "Povest' vremennykh let": A Chiasmus of Stories". Harvard Ukrainian Studies. 28 (1–4). Harvard Ukrainian Research Institute: 567–580. JSTOR 41036982.
- Shea, William H. (1986). "The Prophecy of Daniel 9:24-27". In Holbrook, Frank (ed.). The Seventy Weeks, Leviticus, and the Nature of Prophecy. Daniel and Revelation Committee Series. Vol. 3. Washington, D.C.: Biblical Research Institute, General Conference of Seventh-day Adventists. OCLC 14279279.
