= Baguenaudier =

Disentanglement puzzle

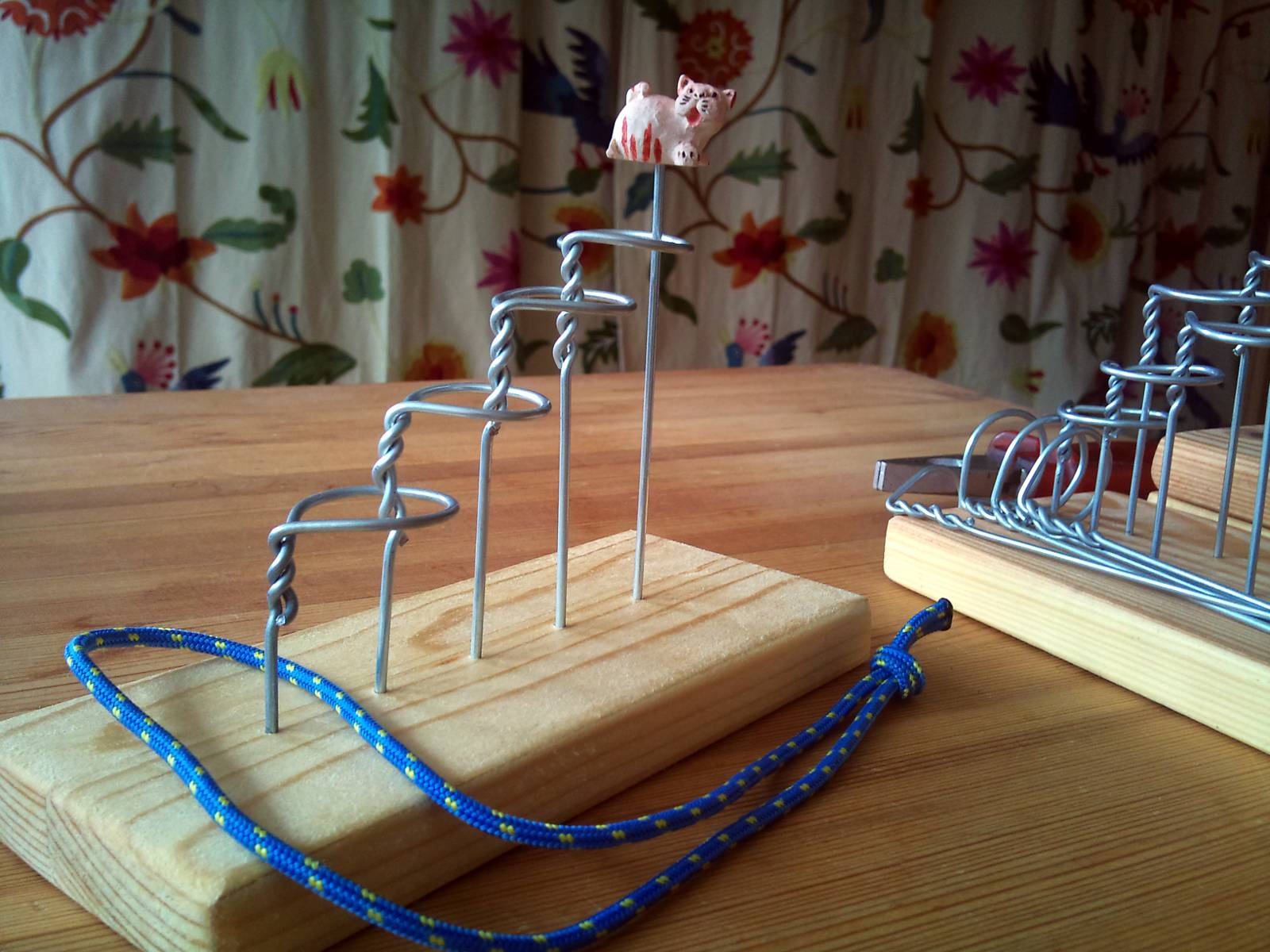
A baguenaudier

Diagrammatic representation of a four-ring baguenaudier

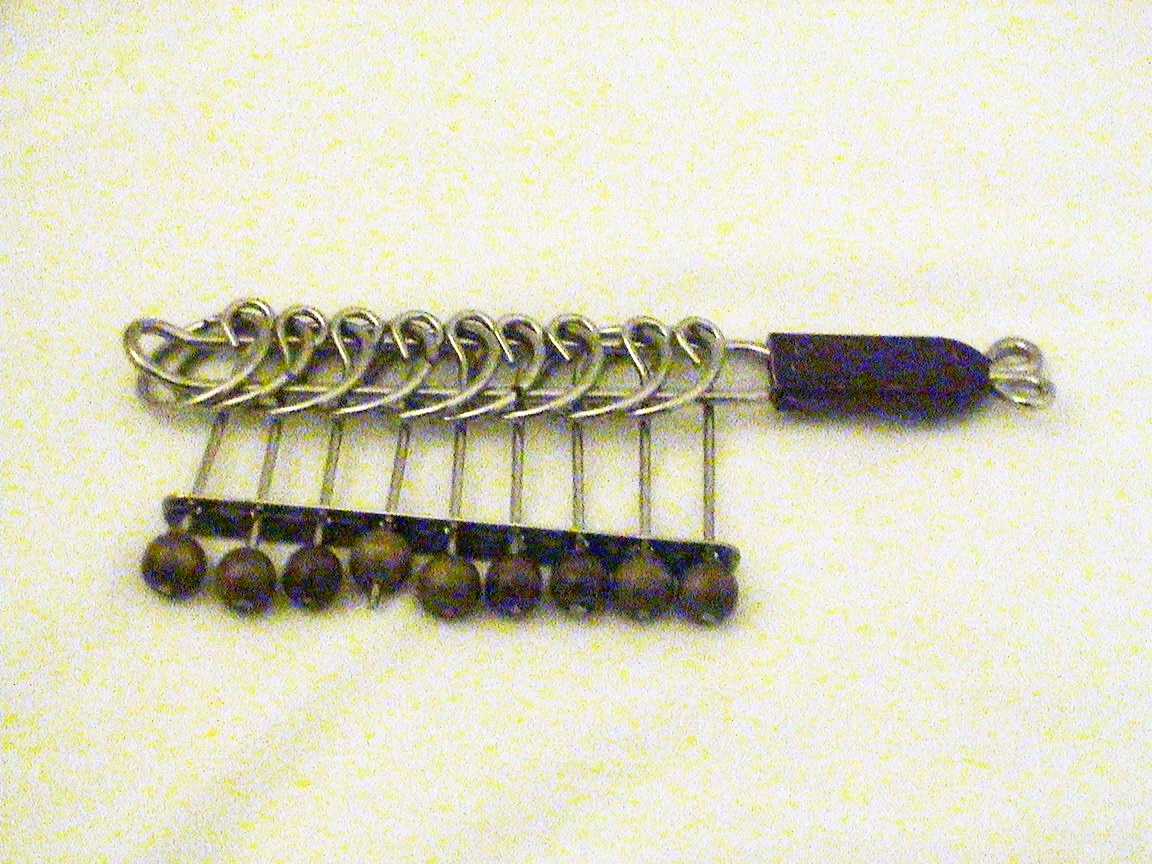
A metal version of the puzzle

Baguenaudier (pronounced [baɡnodje]; French for "time-waster"), also known as the Chinese rings, Cardan's suspension, Cardano's rings, Devil's needle or five pillars puzzle, is a disentanglement puzzle featuring a loop which must be disentangled from a sequence of rings on interlinked pillars. The loop can be either string or a rigid structure.

The origins are obscure, and it is unknown whether the puzzle originated in East Asia or the West. The American ethnographer Stewart Culin related a tradition attributing the puzzle's invention to the 2nd/3rd century Chinese general Zhuge Liang but Culin was relying on an unknown informant; the earliest definitive East Asian reference is an early 16th century mention of a "nine linked rings" toy by Yang Shen in his Sheng an ji. Luca Pacioli's De Viribus Quantitatis of 1509 mentions the puzzle and may predate Yang Shen by a few years, but both authors treat the puzzle as something already well known.

The puzzle was used by French peasants as a locking mechanism.

Variations of this include the Devil's staircase, Devil's Halo and the impossible staircase. Another similar puzzle is the Giant's causeway which uses a separate pillar with an embedded ring.

== Mathematical solution ==
The 19th-century French mathematician Édouard Lucas, the inventor of the Tower of Hanoi puzzle, was known to have come up with an elegant solution which used binary and Gray codes, in the same way that his puzzle can be solved. The minimum number of moves to solve an n-ringed problem has been found to be

$$a(n) = \begin{cases}
\dfrac{2^{n+1} - 2}{3} & \text{when }n\text{ is even,} \\
\dfrac{2^{n+1} - 1}{3} & \text{when }n\text{ is odd.}
\end{cases}$$

For other formulae, see OEIS sequence A000975.

== See also ==
- ABACABA pattern
- Disentanglement puzzle
- Towers of Hanoi
