= Recurrent word =

In mathematics, a recurrent word or sequence is an infinite word over a finite alphabet in which every factor occurs infinitely many times. An infinite word is recurrent if and only if it is a sesquipower.

A uniformly recurrent word is a recurrent word in which for any given factor X in the sequence, there is some length n_{X} (often much longer than the length of X) such that X appears in every block of length n_{X}. The terms minimal sequence and almost periodic sequence (Muchnik, Semenov, Ushakov 2003) are also used.

== Examples ==
- The easiest way to make a recurrent sequence is to form a periodic sequence, one where the sequence repeats entirely after a given number m of steps. Such a sequence is then uniformly recurrent and n_{X} can be set to any multiple of m that is larger than twice the length of X. A recurrent sequence that is ultimately periodic is purely periodic.
- The Thue–Morse sequence is uniformly recurrent without being periodic, nor even eventually periodic (meaning periodic after some nonperiodic initial segment).
- All Sturmian words are uniformly recurrent.
