= Mathematical beauty =

Aesthetic value of mathematics

Mathematical beauty is a type of aesthetic value that is experienced in doing or contemplating mathematics. The testimonies of mathematicians indicate that various aspects of mathematics—including results, formulae, proofs and theories—can trigger subjective responses similar to the beauty of art, music, or nature. The pleasure in this experience can serve as a motivation for doing mathematics, and some mathematicians, such as G.H. Hardy, have characterized mathematics as an art form that seeks beauty.

Beauty in mathematics has been subject to examination by mathematicians themselves and by philosophers, psychologists, and neuroscientists. Understanding beauty in general can be difficult because it is a subjective response to sense-experience but is perceived as a property of an external object, and because it may be shaped by cultural influence or personal experience. Mathematical beauty presents additional problems, since the aesthetic response is evoked by abstract ideas which can be communicated symbolically, and which may only be available to a minority of people with mathematical ability and training. The appreciation of mathematics may also be less passive than (for example) listening to music.

Furthermore, beauty in mathematics may be connected to other aesthetic or non-aesthetic values. Some authors identify mathematical elegance with mathematical beauty; others distinguish elegance as a separate aesthetic value, or as being, for instance, limited to the form of mathematical exposition. Beauty itself is often linked to, or thought to be dependent on, the abstractness, purity, simplicity, depth or order of mathematics.

== Examples of beautiful mathematics ==
=== Results ===
Starting at e^{0} = 1, travelling at the velocity i relative to one's position for the length of time π, and adding 1, one arrives at 0. (The diagram is an Argand diagram.)

Euler's identity is often given as an example of a beautiful result:

$$\displaystyle \mathrm{e}^{\mathrm{i} \pi} +1 = 0\, .$$

This expression ties together arguably the five most important mathematical constants (e, i, π, 1, and 0) with the two most common mathematical symbols (+, =). Euler's identity is a special case of Euler's formula, which the physicist Richard Feynman called "our jewel" and "the most remarkable formula in mathematics".

Another example is Fermat's theorem on sums of two squares, which says that any prime number such that $p \equiv 1 \pmod{4}$ can be written as a sum of two square numbers (for example, $5 = 1^2 + 2^2$, $13 = 2^2 + 3^2$, $37 = 1^2 + 6^2$), which both G.H. Hardy and E.T. Bell thought was a beautiful result.

In a survey in which mathematicians were asked to evaluate 24 theorems for their beauty, the top-rated three theorems were: Euler's equation; Euler's polyhedron formula, which asserts that for a polyhedron with V vertices, E edges, and F faces, $V - E + F = 2$; and Euclid's theorem that there are infinitely many prime numbers, which was also given by Hardy as an example of a beautiful theorem.

=== Proofs ===
An example of "beauty in method"—a simple and elegant visual descriptor of the Pythagorean theorem

Cantor's diagonal argument, which establishes that there are infinite sets which cannot be put into one-to-one correspondence with the infinite set of natural numbers, has been cited by both mathematicians and philosophers as an example of a beautiful proof.

A proof without words for the sum of odd numbers theorem

Visual proofs, such as the illustrated proof of the Pythagorean theorem, and other proofs without words generally, such as the shown proof that the sum of all positive odd numbers up to 2n − 1 is a perfect square, have been thought beautiful.

The mathematician Paul Erdős spoke of The Book, an imaginary infinite book in which God has written down all the most beautiful mathematical proofs. When Erdős wanted to express particular appreciation of a proof, he would proclaim it "straight from The Book!". His rhetorical device inspired the creation of Proofs from THE BOOK, a collection of such proofs, including many suggested by Erdős himself.

=== Objects ===
In Plato's Timaeus, the five regular convex polyhedra, called the Platonic solids for their role in this dialogue, are called the "most beautiful" ("κάλλιστα") bodies. In the Timaeus, they are described as having been used by the demiurge, or creator-craftsman who builds the cosmos, for the four classical elements plus the heavens, because of their beauty.

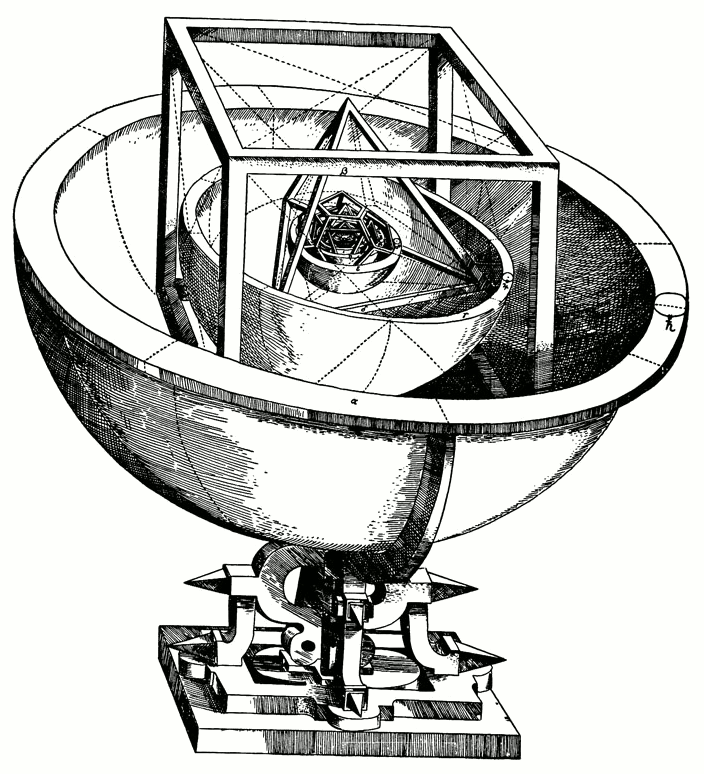
Kepler's Platonic solid model of the solar system

In his 1596 book Mysterium Cosmographicum, Johannes Kepler argued that the orbits of the then-known planets in the Solar System have been arranged by God to correspond to a concentric arrangement of the five Platonic solids, each orbit lying on the circumsphere of one polyhedron and the insphere of another. For Kepler, God had wanted to shape the universe according to the five regular solids because of their beauty, and this explained why there were six planets (according to the knowledge of the time).

Petrie projection of $E_8$

A more modern example is the exceptional simple Lie group $E_8$, which has been called "perhaps the most beautiful structure in all of mathematics".

=== Scientific theories ===
The mathematical statements of scientific theories, especially in physics, are sometimes considered to be mathematically beautiful. For example, Roger Penrose thought there was a "special beauty" in Maxwell's equations of electromagnetism:
$$\begin{align}
\nabla \cdot \mathbf{E} \,\,\, &= \frac{\rho}{\varepsilon_0} \\
\nabla \cdot \mathbf{B} \,\,\, &= 0 \\
\nabla \times \mathbf{E} &= -\frac{\partial \mathbf{B}}{\partial t} \\
\nabla \times \mathbf{B} &= \mu_0 \left(\mathbf{J} + \varepsilon_0  \frac{\partial \mathbf{E}}{\partial t} \right)
\end{align}$$

Einstein's theory of general relativity has been characterized as a work of art, and, among other aesthetic praise, was described by Paul Dirac as having "great mathematical beauty" and by Penrose as having "supreme mathematical beauty".

(There can be more to the beauty of a scientific theory than just its mathematical statement. For example, whether a theory is visualizable or deterministic might have an influence on whether it is seen as beautiful.)

== Properties of beautiful mathematics ==
Many mathematicians and philosophers who have written about mathematical beauty have tried to identify properties or criteria that are conducive to the perception of beauty in a piece of mathematics. It is debated whether beauty can be clarified or explained by such properties. Paul Erdős said “Why are numbers beautiful? It's like asking why is Beethoven’s Ninth Symphony beautiful. If you don't see why, someone can't tell you. I know numbers are beautiful. If they aren't beautiful, nothing is.”

=== Results ===
In his 1940 essay A Mathematician's Apology, G. H. Hardy said that a beautiful result, including its proof, possesses three "purely aesthetic qualities", namely "inevitability", "unexpectedness", and "economy". He particularly excluded enumeration of cases as "one of the duller forms of mathematical argument".

In 1997, Gian-Carlo Rota disagreed with unexpectedness as a sufficient condition for beauty and proposed a counterexample:

A great many theorems of mathematics, when first published, appear to be surprising; thus for example some twenty years ago [from 1977] the proof of the existence of non-equivalent differentiable structures on spheres of high dimension was thought to be surprising, but it did not occur to anyone to call such a fact beautiful, then or now.

In contrast, Monastyrsky wrote in 2001:

It is very difficult to find an analogous invention in the past to Milnor's beautiful construction of the different differential structures on the seven-dimensional sphere... The original proof of Milnor was not very constructive, but later E. Briscorn showed that these differential structures can be described in an extremely explicit and beautiful form.

This disagreement illustrates both the subjective nature of mathematical beauty, like other forms of beauty in general, and its connection with mathematical results: in this case, not only the existence of exotic spheres, but also a particular realization of them.

=== Proofs ===
Besides Hardy's properties of "unexpectedness", "inevitability", and "economy", which he applied to proofs as well as results, mathematicians have customarily thought of beautiful proofs as short and simple.

In the search for an elegant proof, mathematicians often look for different independent ways to prove a result—as the first proof that is found can often be improved. The theorem for which the greatest number of different proofs have been discovered is possibly the Pythagorean theorem, with hundreds of proofs published. Another theorem that has been proved in many different ways is the theorem of quadratic reciprocity. In fact, Carl Friedrich Gauss alone had eight different proofs of this theorem, six of which he published.

In contrast, results that are logically correct but involve laborious calculations or consideration of many cases, are not usually considered beautiful, and may be even referred to as ugly or clumsy. For example, Kenneth Appel and Wolfgang Haken's proof of the four color theorem made use of computer checking of over a thousand cases. Philip J. Davis and Reuben Hersh said that when they first heard that about the proof, they hoped it contained a new insight "whose beauty would transform my day", and were disheartened when informed the proof was by case enumeration and computer verification. Paul Erdős said it was "not beautiful" because it gave no insight into why the theorem was true.

== Philosophical analysis ==
Aristotle thought that beauty was found especially in mathematics, writing in the Metaphysics that

those who assert that the mathematical sciences say nothing of the beautiful or the good are in error. For these sciences say and prove a very great deal about them; for if they do not expressly mention them, but prove attributes which are their results or their formulae, it is not true to say that they tell us nothing about them. The chief forms of beauty are order and symmetry and definiteness, which the mathematical sciences demonstrate in a special degree.

The logician and philosopher Bertrand Russell made a now-famous statement characterizing mathematical beauty in terms of purity and austerity:

Mathematics, rightly viewed, possesses not only truth, but supreme beauty—a beauty cold and austere, like that of sculpture, without appeal to any part of our weaker nature, without the gorgeous trappings of painting or music, yet sublimely pure, and capable of a stern perfection such as only the greatest art can show.

In the twentieth century, some philosophers questioned whether there was genuinely beauty in mathematics. The philosopher of science Rom Harré argued that there were no true aesthetic appraisals of mathematics, but only quasi-aesthetic appraisals. Any mathematical success described by an aesthetic term was a second-order success besides understanding and correctness. In contrast, aesthetic appraisal of a work of art was first-order. Harré considered this to be the difference between a quasi-aesthetic and a genuinely aesthetic appraisal.

Nick Zangwill thought that there were no true aesthetic experiences of mathematics and that a proofs or theories could only be metaphorically beautiful. His argument had two bases. First, he thought that aesthetic properties depended on sensory properties, and so abstract entities could not have aesthetic properties. Second, he thought that proofs, theorems, theories, and so on had purposes such as demonstrating correctness or granting understanding, and that any praise of them reflected only how well they achieved their purpose.

== Scientific analysis ==
=== Information-theory model ===
In the 1970s, Abraham Moles and Frieder Nake analyzed links between beauty, information processing, and information theory. In the 1990s, Jürgen Schmidhuber formulated a mathematical theory of observer-dependent subjective beauty based on algorithmic information theory: the most beautiful objects among subjectively comparable objects have short algorithmic descriptions (i.e., Kolmogorov complexity) relative to what the observer already knows. Schmidhuber explicitly distinguishes between beautiful and interesting. The latter corresponds to the first derivative of subjectively perceived beauty: the observer continually tries to improve the predictability and compressibility of the observations by discovering regularities such as repetitions and symmetries and fractal self-similarity. Whenever the observer's learning process (possibly a predictive artificial neural network) leads to improved data compression such that the observation sequence can be described by fewer bits than before, the temporary interesting-ness of the data corresponds to the compression progress, and is proportional to the observer's internal curiosity reward.

=== Neural correlates ===
Brain imaging experiments conducted by Semir Zeki, Michael Atiyah and collaborators show that the experience of mathematical beauty has, as a neural correlate, activity in field A1 of the medial orbito-frontal cortex (mOFC) of the brain and that this activity is parametrically related to the declared intensity of beauty. The location of the activity is similar to the location of the activity that correlates with the experience of beauty from other sources, such as visual art or music. Moreover, mathematicians seem resistant to revising their judgment of the beauty of a mathematical formula in light of contradictory opinion given by their peers.

== Mathematical beauty and the arts ==
=== Music ===
Examples of the use of mathematics in music include the stochastic music of Iannis Xenakis, the Fibonacci sequence in Tool's Lateralus, and the Metric modulation of Elliott Carter.

Other instances include the counterpoint of Johann Sebastian Bach, polyrhythmic structures (as in Igor Stravinsky's The Rite of Spring), permutation theory in serialism beginning with Arnold Schoenberg, the application of Shepard tones in Karlheinz Stockhausen's Hymnen and the application of Group theory to transformations in music in the theoretical writings of David Lewin.

=== Visual arts ===
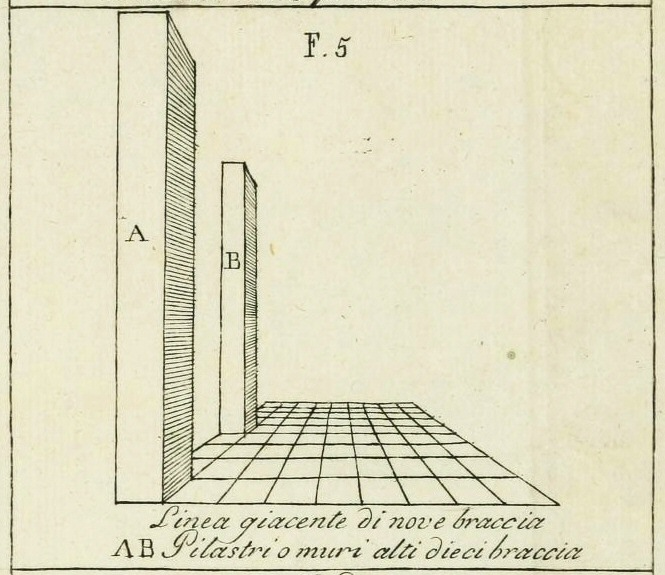
Diagram from Leon Battista Alberti's 1435 Della Pittura, with pillars in perspective on a grid

Examples of the use of mathematics in the visual arts include applications of chaos theory and fractal geometry to computer-generated art, symmetry studies of Leonardo da Vinci, projective geometries in development of the perspective theory of Renaissance art, grids in Op art, optical geometry in the camera obscura of Giambattista della Porta, and multiple perspective in analytic cubism and futurism.

Sacred geometry is a field of its own, giving rise to countless art forms including some of the best known mystic symbols and religious motifs, and has a particularly rich history in Islamic architecture. It also provides a means of meditation and comtemplation, for example the study of the Kaballah Sefirot (Tree Of Life) and Metatron's Cube; and also the act of drawing itself.

The Dutch graphic designer M. C. Escher created mathematically inspired woodcuts, lithographs, and mezzotints. These feature impossible constructions, explorations of infinity, architecture, visual paradoxes and tessellations.

Some painters and sculptors create work distorted with the mathematical principles of anamorphosis, including South African sculptor Jonty Hurwitz.

Origami, the art of paper folding, has aesthetic qualities and many mathematical connections. One can study the mathematics of paper folding by observing the crease pattern on unfolded origami pieces.

British constructionist artist John Ernest created reliefs and paintings inspired by group theory. A number of other British artists of the constructionist and systems schools of thought also draw on mathematics models and structures as a source of inspiration, including Anthony Hill and Peter Lowe. Computer-generated art is based on mathematical algorithms.

== See also ==
- Argument from beauty
- Fluency heuristic
- Golden ratio
- Neuroesthetics
- Philosophy of mathematics
- Processing fluency theory of aesthetic pleasure
- Pythagoreanism
- Sense of wonder
- Theory of everything
