= Rhetoric of Donald Trump =

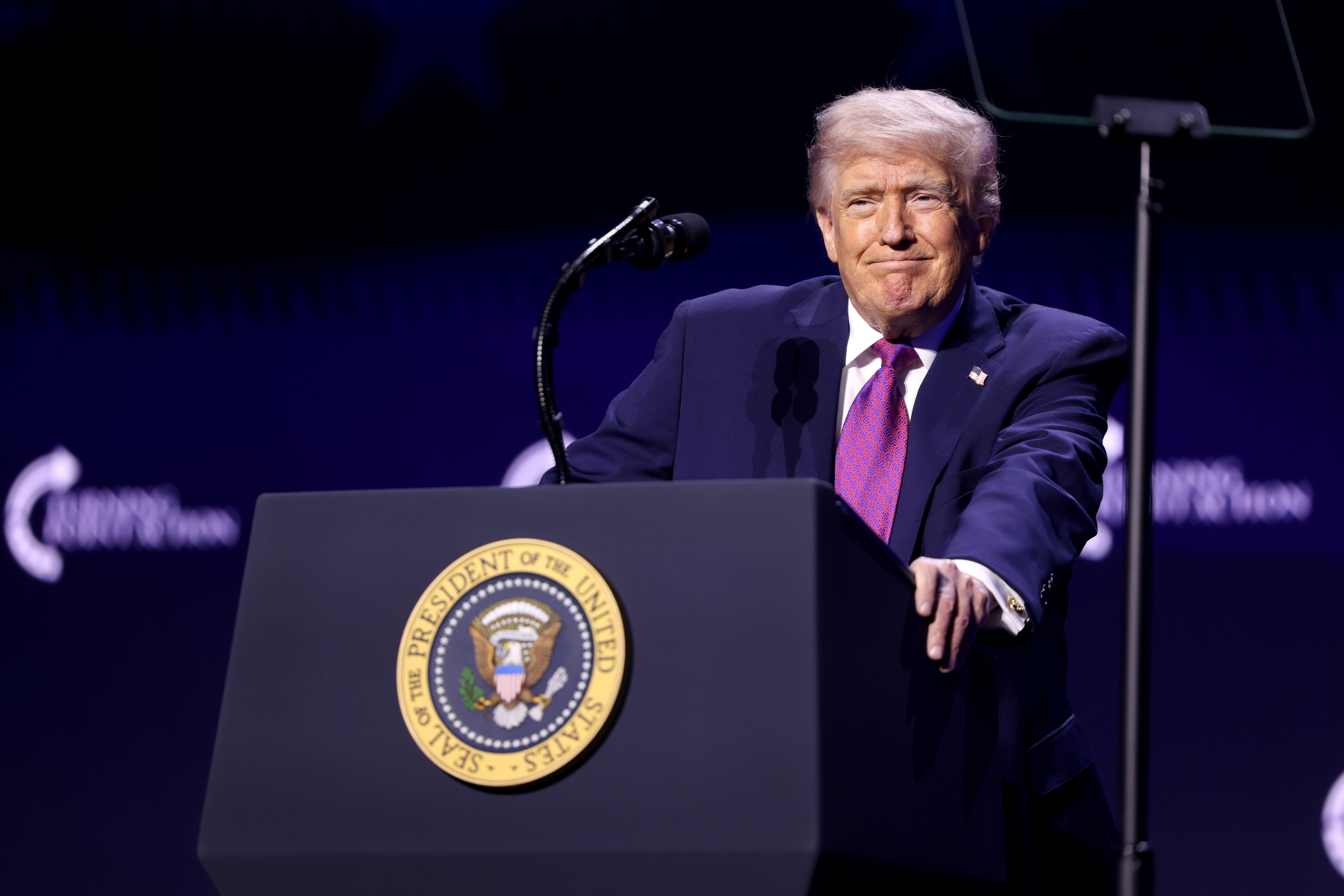
Trump at the 2026 "Build the Red Wall" rally at Dream City Church in Arizona

The rhetoric of Donald Trump, the 45th and 47th president of the United States, is widely recognized for its populist, nationalistic, and confrontational style. It has been the subject of extensive analysis by linguists, political scientists, and communication experts. Known for its direct and unfiltered approach, Trump's rhetoric emphasizes themes of crisis, division, and loyalty, often casting himself as an outsider fighting against a corrupt political establishment. Central to his communication strategy are emotional appeals that resonate with voter insecurity, promises of restoring past national "greatness", and the use of simple, repetitive language that amplifies his message to broad audiences.

Trump's rhetoric often frames complex issues in binary terms, using absolutes such as "always" and "never" to express uncompromising stances. This strategy creates a polarized worldview, encouraging audiences to see political opponents and external threats as existential dangers to the nation. Trump's rhetoric often uses superlatives to contrast and compare his own ideas and plans to those of others, usually comparing the "Best" to the "Worst". His rhetorical style is further characterized by a high volume of lies, sometimes leveraging what analysts describe as the "firehose of falsehood" propaganda technique. This approach to information dissemination—marked by sheer volume and speed—can overwhelm fact-checking mechanisms and further entrench his narratives among his supporters.

Throughout his political career, Trump has been noted for using inflammatory language, including violent terms and metaphors, particularly when discussing immigration, crime, and political adversaries. His rhetoric has been linked by some scholars to an increase in political hostility and even violence, as it often features direct or implied threats against perceived enemies. Additionally, his speeches frequently draw on populist themes, casting blame on specific groups or individuals for societal problems, which scholars argue has contributed to an atmosphere of distrust and division within the U.S.

Critics argue that Trump's communication style borrows from authoritarian playbooks, citing his use of scapegoating, appeals to nationalism, and rhetorical attacks on the media. While supporters view his rhetoric as a refreshing departure from political correctness and establishment politics, detractors contend it erodes democratic norms and fuels divisiveness. This rhetoric remains a defining element of Trump's influence on American politics.

== Overview ==
Trump's rhetoric has its roots in a populist political method that suggests nationalistic answers to political, economic, and social problems. It employs absolutist framings and threat narratives characterized by a rejection of the political establishment. Trump's rhetoric has been identified as using a three-fold rhetorical strategy, that being "it tells audiences what is wrong with the current state of affairs; it identifies the political agents that are responsible for putting individuals and the country in a state of loss and crisis; and it offers an abstract pathway through which people can restore past greatness by opting for a high-risk outsider candidate". Through the creation of a crisis narrative, Trump's rhetoric relies on creating a sense of insecurity among voters that it promises to eradicate for political gain. His absolutist rhetoric emphasizes non-negotiable boundaries and moral outrage at their supposed violation, and heavily favors crowd reaction over veracity, with a large number of falsehoods which Trump presents as facts, which have been described as using the big lie, and firehose of falsehood propaganda technique.

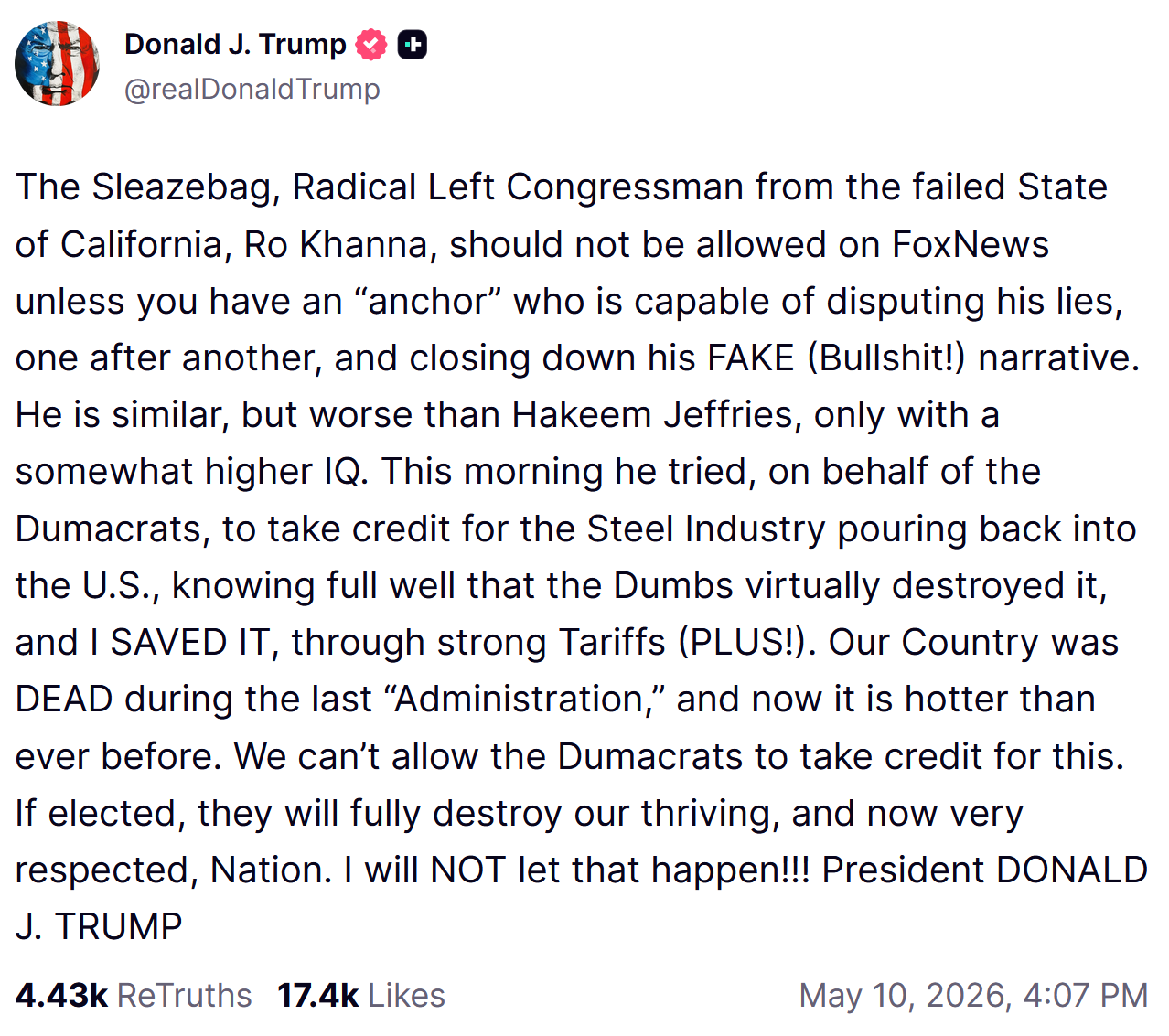
A Truth Social post by Trump on May 10, 2026 highlighting his rhetorical style

Trump's scenic construction (introduction of characters and setting stage depicting an issue) uses black and white terms such as "totally", "absolutely", "every", "complete", and "forever" to describe malevolent forces, or the coming victory. For example, Trump described John Kerry as a "total disaster", and said that Obamacare would "destroy American health care forever". Kenneth Burke referred to this type of "all or none" staging as characteristic of "burlesque" rhetoric. He frequently shifts positions and contradicts himself, sometimes in the same day, in a rhetorical tactic described as presenting him plausible deniability through dueling narratives and allowing the American public the ability to pick and choose what they want to believe about his intentions.

By 2024, The New York Times reported that Trump's speeches had grown "darker, harsher, longer, angrier, less focused, more profane and increasingly fixated on the past" and that experts described it as increasingly rambling, tangential, and featuring behavioral disinhibition as a possible consequence of advancing age and cognitive decline. It highlighted an average rally length of 82 minutes compared with 45 minutes in 2016, and a 13% increase in use of all-or-nothing terms such as "always" and "never". It also found 32% more negative words than positive words compared with 21% in 2016, and a 69% increase in swear words. Trump described his rambling, off-script style of speaking as "the weave" and insisted it was both intentional and oratorical genius.

During his second presidency, Trump's rhetoric has leaned into likening himself as a higher figure than president. Examples include saying "He who saves his Country does not violate any Law" and comparing himself to a king. White House social media posted an image depicting Trump with a crown, and Trump and his allies referred to him with monarchical terminology and claims of divine legitimacy.

=== Analysis ===
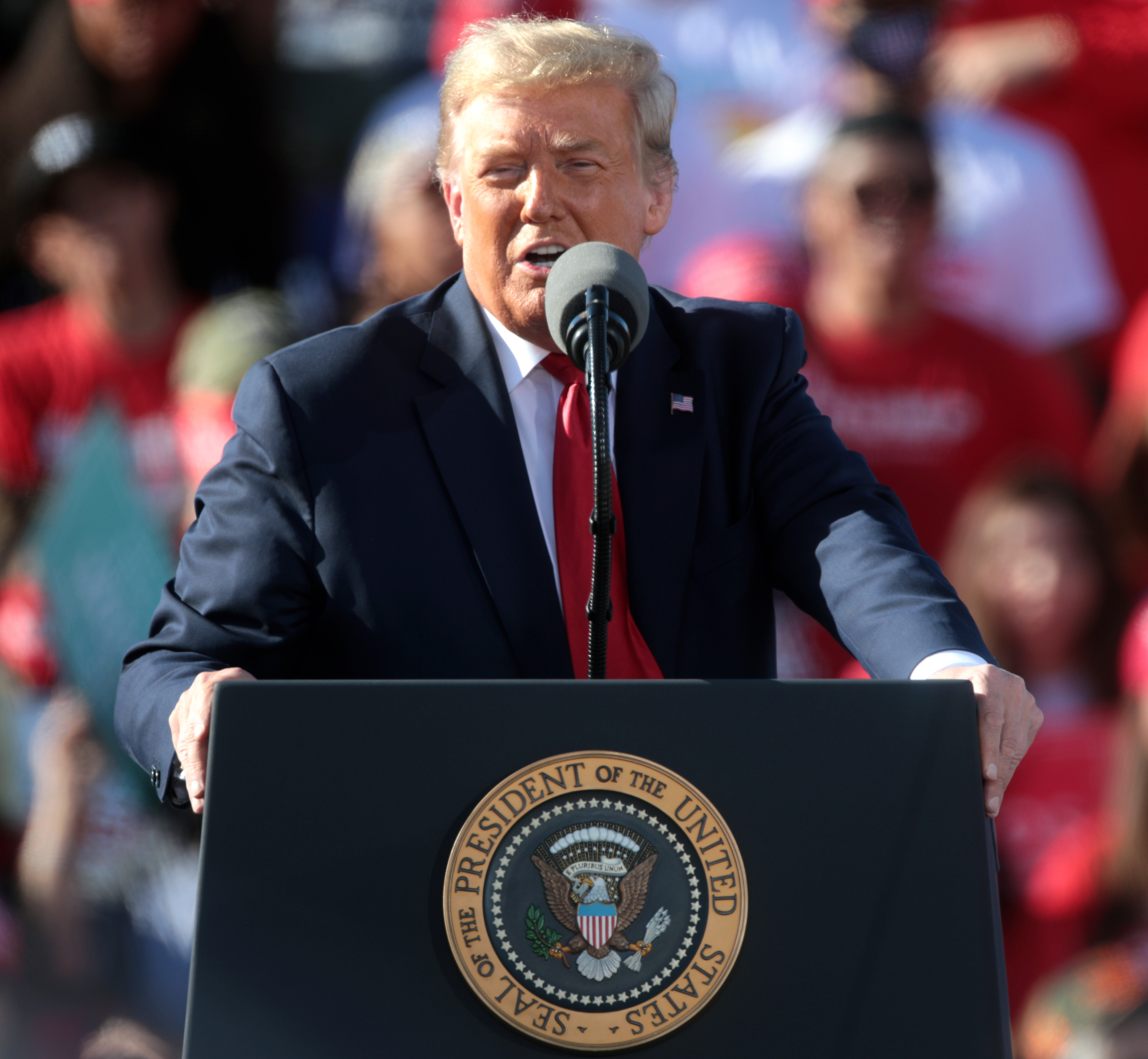
Trump speaking at one of his rallies in Arizona, October 2020

Research has identified Trump's rhetoric as heavily using vitriol, demeaning language, false equivalency, exclusion, and fearmongering about immigrants, crime, and minorities as essential to his support. In a 2016 interview with Bob Woodward and Robert Costa, Trump said that, "Real power is — I don't even want to use the word — fear." Trump uses rhetoric that political scientists have deemed to be both dehumanizing and connected to physical violence by his followers. Sociologist Arlie Hochschild states that emotional themes in Trump's rhetoric are fundamental, writing that his "speeches—evoking dominance, bravado, clarity, national pride, and personal uplift—inspire an emotional transformation", deeply resonating with their "emotional self-interest". One study suggests that the use of spectacular racist rhetoric aided in the significant environmental deregulation that occurred during the first year of the Trump administration. According to the authors, this served political objectives of dehumanizing its targets, eroding democratic norms, and consolidating power by emotionally connecting with and inflaming resentments among the base of followers, but most importantly served to distract media attention from deregulatory policymaking by igniting intense media coverage of the distractions, precisely due to their radically transgressive nature. The New York Times described his vilification of his political opponents and journalists as unlike any modern American president, with him frequently referring to them as "evil". For instance, in 2025, Trump called Democrats "the party of hate, evil, and Satan"; in 2024 he called Democrats "demonic", and referred to them at rallies as "so evil", "dangerous", "the enemy within", and that "They're Marxists and communists and fascists, and they're sick". In 2026, Trump called Democrats "traitors" and "human garbage" for not supporting his policies.

According to civil rights lawyer Burt Neuborne and political theorist William E. Connolly, Trump's rhetoric employs tropes similar to those used by fascists in Germany to persuade citizens (at first a minority) to give up democracy, by using a barrage of falsehoods, half-truths, personal invective, threats, xenophobia, national-security scares, religious bigotry, white racism, exploitation of economic insecurity, and a never-ending search for scapegoats. Connolly presents a similar list in his book Aspirational Fascism (2017), adding comparisons of the integration of theatrics and crowd participation with rhetoric, involving grandiose bodily gestures, grimaces, hysterical charges, dramatic repetitions of alternate reality falsehoods, and totalistic assertions incorporated into signature phrases that audiences are strongly encouraged to join in chanting. Despite the similarities, Connolly stresses that Trump is no Nazi but "is rather, an aspirational fascist who pursues crowd adulation, hyperaggressive nationalism, white triumphalism, and militarism, pursues a law-and-order regime giving unaccountable power to the police, and is a practitioner of a rhetorical style that regularly creates fake news and smears opponents to mobilize support for the Big Lies he advances".

It has been suggested that Trump's Big Lies consist of bullshit rather than of lying as strictly defined. According to Harry Frankfurt's 2005 book On Bullshit, the liar cares about the truth and attempts to hide it, while the bullshitter does not care whether what they say is true or false. By ignoring the facts, bullshit has the power to guide group beliefs in a politically desirable direction and thereby to shape group identities.

Media ethicist Kelly McBride has commented that it is a difficult task for journalists to convey this rhetoric in a succinct way, which results in criticisms of "sanewashing"; that is, that journalists are "selectively quoting his speeches to make them sound more coherent than they actually are" and "packaging Trump's ideas into news stories as if they are sensible suggestions".

== Trumpisms ==
Trump's "Make America Great Again!" sign used during his 2016 presidential campaign before Trump selected Mike Pence as his vice presidential running mate

Trumpisms or Trump-speak are the mannerisms, rhetoric, and characteristic phrases or statements of Trump. They have been described as colorful comments that "only Trump could get away with". By 2016, Politico observed that what used to be called Trump's gaffes now had the official designation of "Trumpisms". They have become well-known and are the subject of numerous comedic impersonations that imitate Trump's confident exaggerations and general lack of detail. An MIT student built a Twitter bot that used artificial intelligence to parody the President with "remarkably Trump-like statements". Artificial intelligence has also been used to analyze Trump-speak. Trump's children have acknowledged his atypical speech patterns, with both Ivanka and Eric Trump stating that they share some of their father's Trumpisms.

Journalist Emily Greenhouse noted in a 2015 Bloomberg article that Trump may be the most quotable man in politics and highlighted the following example:

I'm the most successful person ever to run for the presidency, by far. Nobody's ever been more successful than me. I'm the most successful person ever to run. Ross Perot isn't successful like me. Romney—I have a Gucci store that's worth more than Romney.

Trumpisms frequently come in the form of insults directed at his critics, labeling them "dogs", "haters and losers", and "enemies of the people". He is known for his use of apophasis to this effect. For example, he said of Kim Jong Un, "I would NEVER call him 'short and fat'."

=== Examples ===
- Trump frequently employs hyperbole, such as "hottest country anywhere in the world", "largest wave of mass migration in human history", "the greatest", "never before", etc.
- Self-aggrandization combined with hyperbole or repetitive phrasing, such as "I'm intelligent. Some people would say I'm very, very, very intelligent", "I did very well with Chinese people. Very well. Believe me."
- Use of "losers", "stupid", combined with any of the above: "Sorry losers and haters, but my I.Q. is one of the highest — and you all know it!", "Our leaders are stupid. They are stupid people. It's just very, very sad."
- "Sad!", "Fake news!", "Believe me!" as stand-alone phrases.
- Several Trumpisms have become memes, such as "Many such cases", "Thank you [X], very cool", "Make [X] [Y] again", "This has been the worst [X] in the history of [Y], maybe ever."
- "He died like a dog. He died like a coward." in reference to the death of Abu Bakr al-Baghdadi.

== Violence ==
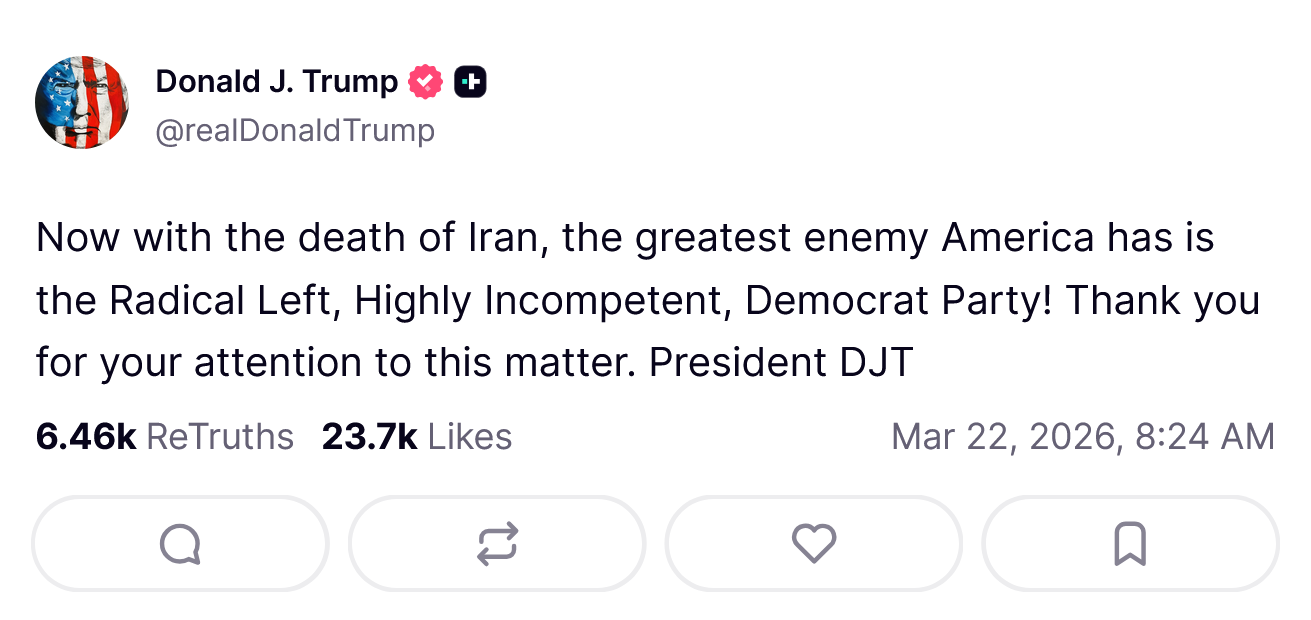
Trump regularly uses social media to criticize his political opponents. Democratic officials have criticized the posts as encouraging political violence.

Trump has been identified as a key figure in increasing political violence in America both for and against him. Trump has embraced extremism, conspiracy theories such as Q-Anon, and far-right militia movements to a greater extent than any modern American president. Trump has espoused combative and violent rhetoric and promised retribution against his political enemies. (Note: Attributed to multiple sources:) Trump's normalization and revisionist history of the January 6 Capitol attack and grant of clemency to all January 6 rioters including the Proud Boys and Oath Keepers was described by counterterrorism researchers as encouraging future political violence, and Trump later suggested the two groups may have a place in the political conversation.

In 2023, Reuters released a series of reports examining the highest levels of politically motivated violence since the 1970s that started in 2016 when Trump first ran for president, which has seen relatively more violence directed at people instead of property. Reuters notes a few theories for this increase, including the 'coarsening' political rhetoric of the Trump era. They also found that the people who murdered others for political reasons since January 6, 2021, have mostly been associated with the extreme right.

Trump's rhetoric has been described as using Argumentum ad baculum, or an appeal to force and intimidation to coerce behavior. Trump has been noted to use either direct or veiled comments with plausible deniability suggesting the possibility of violence by his supporters. He has been described as using stochastic terrorism. In Politico, Michael Schaffer wrote, "In the 45th and possibly 47th president, America has a leading political figure of unprecedented rhetorical violence."

=== 2016 presidential campaign ===
Donald Trump's 2016 presidential campaign announcement has been criticized for its dehumanizing rhetoric about Mexican immigrants with his false comments that, "When Mexico sends its people, they're not sending their best ... They're sending people that have lots of problems, and they're bringing those problems with [them]. They're bringing drugs. They're bringing crime. They're rapists. And some, I assume, are good people."

On February 1, 2016, in response to an individual throwing two tomatoes at Trump, he told his rally at Cedar Rapids, Iowa that should a similar incident happen, the audience should, "knock the crap out of 'em, would you?"

On February 23, 2016, after a heckler was removed from one of his rallies at Las Vegas, Nevada, Trump told the audience that, "I'd like to punch him in the face, I tell you."

In 2016, stochastic terrorism was an "obscure" academic term according to professor David S. Cohen. During an August 9, 2016, campaign rally, then-candidate Donald Trump remarked, "If [Hillary Clinton] gets to pick her judges, nothing you can do, folks. Although the Second Amendment people, maybe there is. I don't know." These comments were widely condemned as instigating violence, and described by Cohen as "stochastic terrorism", further popularizing the term.

In response to the growing threat of ISIS, Trump called for the targeted killing of terrorists' family members, which drew near-unanimous condemnation.

=== First presidency ===
On July 28, 2017, while giving a speech to police officers, Trump said "don't be too nice" when arresting suspects. His remarks were criticized by NYPD commissioner James O'Neill.

On February 5, 2018, Trump implied that Democrats that did not applaud him during his State of the Union address may have committed "treason". His comment was criticized by Senator Dick Durbin.

In May 2019, during a Trump campaign rally, an audience member suggested shooting illegal migrants crossing the border, to which Trump responded with a joke, saying, "only in the Panhandle you can get away with that".

=== 2020 presidential campaign ===
During the COVID-19 pandemic in 2020, Trump routinely used the phrases "China virus", "Chinese virus", and "Kung flu", which were scrutinized due to their perceived insensitivity to the rising hate crimes against Asian Americans. Trump frequently criticized Antifa and Black Lives Matter (BLM) protestors in language that some found concerning. Trump also repeatedly criticized election methods (especially mail-in voting) in certain states, which led to election workers being harassed. Assaults and threats against election workers by supporters of Trump increased significantly after the election inspired by his false claims that the election was stolen, which Reuters called "a campaign of intimidation that is stressing the foundation of American democracy". Reuters explicitly labeled some of the death threats as inspired by Donald Trump. The Justice Department has reviewed over 2000 threats made to election workers, various jurisdictions have brought charges against some of those threatening election workers and 12 states have strengthened laws protecting election workers.

On May 30, 2020, ABC News published a story that found 54 instances of violence, alleged assaults and threats where Trump was explicitly invoked in court records or other documents, with 41 echoing Trump and 13 in defiance to Trump. On January 9, 2021, Vox published "a comprehensive timeline of Trump encouraging hate groups and political violence".

=== 2024 presidential campaign ===
Trump's 2024 campaign has been noted for using increasingly violent rhetoric against his political enemies. Trump has attacked the witnesses, judges, juries, and families of individuals involved in his criminal trials. As with his previous presidential campaigns, Trump's 2024 campaign has regularly espoused anti-immigrant nativist fearmongering, (Note: Sources that describe Trump's 2024 campaign as using "fearmongering" and "fear" include:) racial stereotypes, and dehumanized immigrants. Trump's anti-immigration tone has grown harsher compared to his previous time as president. Several of Trump's statements and actions have been accused of echoing Nazi rhetoric, far-right ideology, antisemitism, and white supremacy. According to The New York Times in 2023, scholars are undecided about whether Trump's "rhetorical turn into more fascist-sounding territory is just his latest public provocation of the left, an evolution in his beliefs, or the dropping of a veil". It also reported that some experts concluded that Trump "exhibits traits similar to current strongmen such as Viktor Orbán of Hungary or Recep Tayyip Erdoğan of Turkey". Trump's harsher rhetoric against his political enemies has been described by historians and scholars as populist, authoritarian, fascist, (Note: Attributed to multiple references:) and unlike anything a political candidate has ever said in American history. In the 20 rallies since Trump's debate with Kamala Harris, Politico found his rhetoric, especially around immigrants, getting darker, citing experts who found it strongly echoed authoritarian and Nazi ideology. He suggested former General Mark Milley be executed and accused him of disloyalty.

Trump's campaign statements were connected to an embrace of right-wing extremism. He proclaimed that undocumented immigrants were "poisoning the blood of our country" and had "bad genes," which, according to some commentators, strikingly resembled Hitler and white supremacists' racial hygiene rhetoric. On Veterans Day 2023, he called some of his political opponents "vermin," which also seemed to echo Hitler and Benito Mussolini's language. Trump demonized his political opponents; Democrats were labelled as "evil" and "demonic", and Harris as "the Antichrist". Trump labelled illegal immigrants as subhuman: "vile animals", "savages", "not human", "not people", "stone-cold killers", "monsters", and "predators". At rallies, the former President stated that they will "walk in your kitchen, they'll cut your throat", and "grab young girls and slice them up right in front of their parents". On multiple occasions, Trump and Republicans promoted the conspiracy that Haitian immigrants in Springfield, Ohio, were looting and eating people's pets. As a result of their efforts, dozens of bomb threats emerged targeting Springfield schools, hospitals, public buildings, and businesses.

=== Second presidency ===
Asked: Are there limits on your global power?

Yeah, there is one thing. My own morality. My own mind. It's the only thing that can stop me. I don't need international law. I'm not looking to hurt people.

— Donald Trump, January 7, 2026

New York Times White House correspondents wrote that "Mr. Trump’s assessment ... was the most blunt acknowledgment yet of his worldview. At its core is the concept that national strength, rather than laws, treaties and conventions, should be the deciding factor as powers collide."

Through early October 2026, Trump had attacked the integrity of US elections on more than 70% of the days following his 2025 inauguration, repeatedly making false claims.

During Trump's second term he has called for political rivals such as California Governor Gavin Newsom and 2025 New York City Democratic mayoral nominee Zohran Mamdani to be arrested. During a June 2025 speech Trump referred to participants in the anti-ICE Los Angeles protests as "animals" and "enemies". Following the October 18 No Kings protests, Trump reposted an AI generated video of himself flying a plane labelled with "King Trump", and dumping sewage over the protesters.

In November 2025, Trump made multiple social media posts about six Democrats (Mark Kelly, Elissa Slotkin, Jason Crow, Chrissy Houlahan, Chris Deluzio and Maggie Goodlander) who had recorded a video telling servicemembers to refuse illegal orders, calling them traitors who should to be charged with sedition punishable by death, and shared a social media post calling for Democrats to be hanged.

In December 2025, following the killing of Rob and Michele Reiner, Trump mocked Rob Reiner in a Truth Social post, writing that "a very sad thing happened" while claiming that Reiner and his wife died "reportedly due to the anger he caused others through his massive, unyielding, and incurable affliction with a mind crippling disease known as Trump derangement syndrome". In March 2026, following the death of Robert Mueller, a former director of the Federal Bureau of Investigation who led a special counsel investigation investigating Russian interference in the 2016 United States elections and links between Trump associates and Russian officials, Trump responded in a Truth Social post: "Good, I'm glad he's dead. He can no longer hurt innocent people!" During the 2026 Iran war, Trump posted on April 7 that "a whole civilization will die tonight, never to be brought back again", leading to accusations of incitement of crimes against humanity, genocide, and war crimes.

== Falsehoods ==
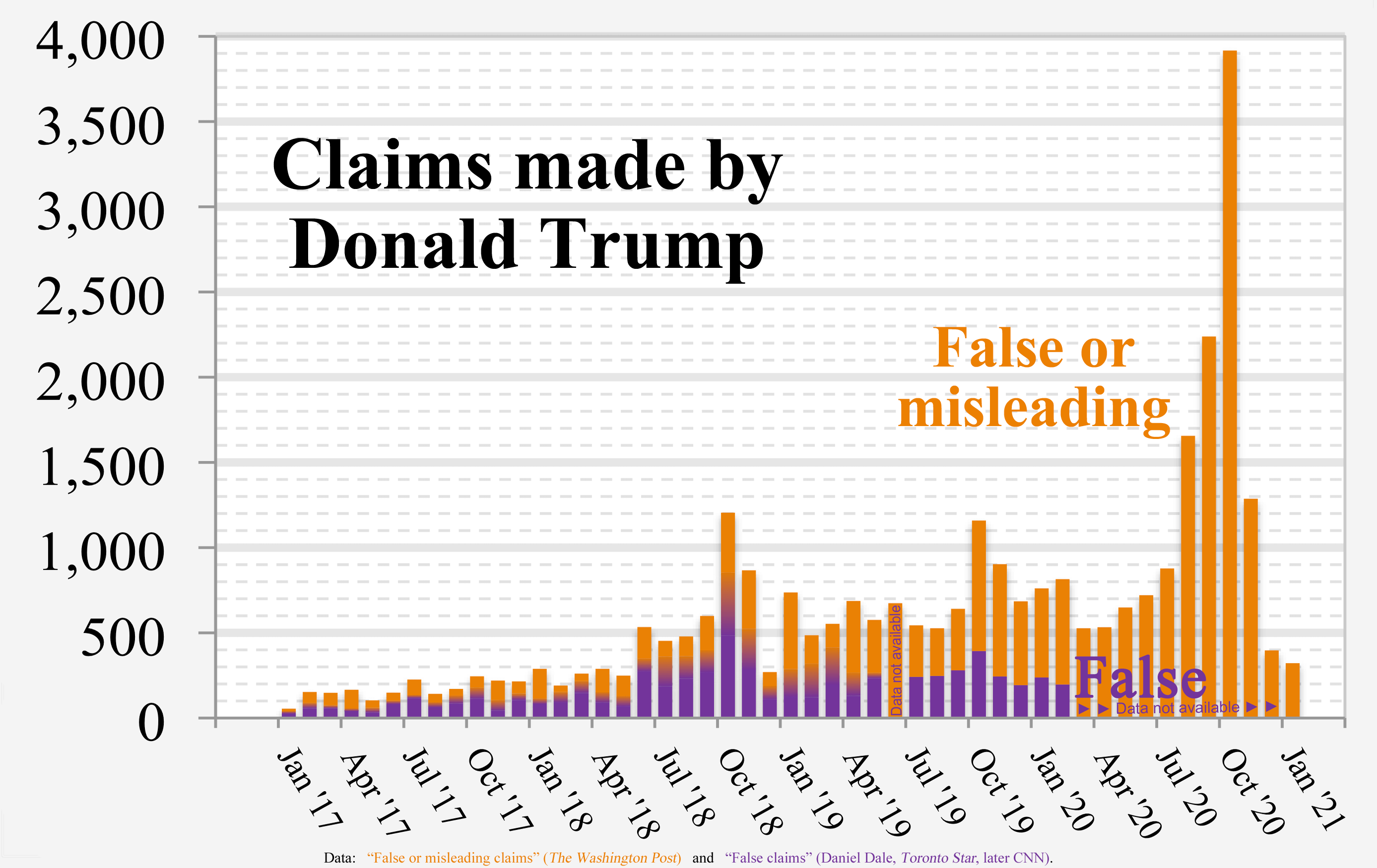
Fact-checkers from The Washington Post (top, monthly), the Toronto Star, and CNN (bottom, weekly) compiled data on "false or misleading claims" (orange) and "false claims" (blue), respectively. The peaks corresponded in late 2018 to the midterm elections, in late 2019 to his impeachment inquiry, and in late 2020 to the presidential election. The Post reported 30,573 false or misleading claims in four years, an average of more than 20.9 per day.

Trump escalated use of "rigged election" and "election interference" statements in advance of the 2024 election compared to the previous two elections—the statements described as part of a "heads I win; tails you cheated" rhetorical strategy.

During and after his term as President of the United States, Trump made tens of thousands of false or misleading claims. The Washington Post's fact-checkers documented 30,573 false or misleading claims during his presidential term, an average of about 21 per day. The Toronto Star tallied 5,276 false claims from January 2017 to June 2019, an average of 6.1 per day. Commentators and fact-checkers have described the scale of Trump's mendacity as "unprecedented" in American politics, and the consistency of falsehoods a distinctive part of his business and political identities. Scholarly analysis of Trump's tweets found "significant evidence" of an intent to deceive.

By June 2019, after initially resisting, many news organizations began to describe some of his falsehoods as "lies". The Washington Post said his frequent repetition of claims he knew to be false amounted to a campaign based on disinformation. Trump campaign CEO and presidency chief strategist Steve Bannon said that the press, rather than Democrats, was Trump's primary adversary and "the way to deal with them is to flood the zone with shit".

As part of their attempts to overturn the 2020 U.S. presidential election, Trump and his allies repeatedly falsely claimed there had been massive election fraud and that Trump had won the election. Their effort has been characterized as an implementation of the big lie propaganda technique, and has been described as a "firehose of falsehood".

On June 8, 2023, a grand jury indicted Trump on one count of making "false statements and representations", specifically by hiding subpoenaed classified documents from his own attorney who was trying to find and return them to the government. In August 2023, 21 of Trump's falsehoods about the 2020 election were listed in his Washington, D.C. indictment, while 27 were listed in his Georgia indictment.

Former FBI Director James Comey reflected on what he described as “the psychology of liars” in a discussion of leadership and loyalty. In what journalist Philip Rucker described as “an apparent nod” to Trump, Comey drew comparisons between his experiences prosecuting the Mafia and serving in the Trump administration, including a loyalty pledge he said he was asked to make but refused. Comey wrote:

"The silent circle of assent. The boss in complete control. The loyalty oaths. The us-versus-them worldview. The lying about all things, large and small, in service to some code of loyalty that put the organization above morality and above the truth.... [Liars] lose the ability to distinguish between what's true and what's not", Comey writes. "They surround themselves with other liars.... Perks and access are given to those willing to lie and tolerate lies. This creates a culture, which becomes an entire way of life."

A 2024 New Republic article examined the relationship between lies Trump tells and his approval among voters, suggesting it has a significant impact on his support.

At the beginning of early voting, NPR described Trump as using darker rhetoric including escalating insults, threats and lies.

=== Incorrectly attributed quotes ===
Trump's rhetoric has been repeated and echoed extensively on social media by both Trump supporters and Trump opponents. Due to the limitations of some platforms, such as the 100 character limit on Twitter, now known as X, Trump quotes often lack context. In rare instances, quotes that could credibly be attributed to Trump did not actually originate from Trump himself.

== See also ==
- List of nicknames used by Donald Trump

== Sources ==
- Adams, Kenneth Alan (Spring 2021). "The Trump Death Cult". Journal of Psychohistory. 48 (4): 256–276. ISSN 0145-3378.
- Berman, Sheri (May 2021). "The Causes of Populism in the West". Annual Review of Political Science. 24: 71–88. doi:10.1146/annurev-polisci-041719-102503. ISSN 1094-2939.
- Campani, Giovanna; Concepción, Sunamis Fabelo; Soler, Angel Rodriguez; Savín, Claudia Sánchez (November 2, 2022). "The Rise of Donald Trump Right-Wing Populism in the United States: Middle American Radicalism and Anti-Immigration Discourse". Societies. 12 (6): 154. doi:10.3390/soc12060154.
- de Berg, Henk (2024). Trump and Hitler: A Comparative Study in Lying. Palgrave Macmillan. p. 340. ISBN 978-3-031-51832-4.
- Diamond, Michael J. (February 22, 2023). "Perverted Containment: Trumpism, Cult Creation, and the Rise of Destructive American Populism". Psychoanalytic Inquiry. 43 (2): 96–109. doi:10.1080/07351690.2023.2163147.
- Franks, Andrew S.; Hesami, Farhang (September 18, 2021). "Seeking Evidence of The MAGA Cult and Trump Derangement Syndrome: An Examination of (A)symmetric Political Bias". Societies. 11 (3): 113. doi:10.3390/soc11030113.
- Hassan, Steven (2019). The Cult of Trump. Simon & Schuster. ISBN 978-1-9821-2733-6.
- Kakutani, Michiko (2018). "The Firehose of Falsehood: Propaganda and Fake News". The Death of Truth: Notes on Falsehood in the Age of Trump. Crown/Archetype. ISBN 978-0-525-57484-2.
- Kaufman, Robert R.; Haggard, Stephan (2019). "Democratic Decline in the United States: What Can We Learn from Middle-Income Backsliding?". Perspectives on Politics. 17 (2): 417–432. doi:10.1017/S1537592718003377. S2CID 149457724.
- Lajevardi, Nazita; Oskooii, Kassra A. R. (2018). "Old-Fashioned Racism, Contemporary Islamophobia, and the Isolation of Muslim Americans in the Age of Trump". Journal of Race, Ethnicity, and Politics. 3 (1): 112–152. doi:10.1017/rep.2017.37.
- Parker, Christopher Sebastian; Towler, Christopher C. (May 2019). "Race and Authoritarianism in American Politics". Annual Review of Political Science. 22: 503–519. doi:10.1146/annurev-polisci-050317-064519. ISSN 1094-2939.
- Perry, Samuel L.; Whitehead, Andrew L.; Grubbs, Joshua B. (April 21, 2021). "The Devil That You Know: Christian Nationalism and Intent to Change One's Voting Behavior For or Against Trump in 2020". Politics and Religion. 15 (2): 229–246. doi:10.1017/S175504832100002X. hdl:11244/334967.
- Reyes, Antonio (May 4, 2020). "I, Trump The cult of personality, anti-intellectualism and the Post-Truth era". Journal of Language and Politics. 19 (6): 869–892. doi:10.1075/jlp.20002.rey. ISSN 1569-2159.
- Ross, Bertrall L. (October 2024). "Polarization, Populism, and the Crisis of American Democracy". Annual Review of Law and Social Science. 20: 293–308. doi:10.1146/annurev-lawsocsci-041922-035113. ISSN 1550-3631.
- Rothe, Dawn L.; Collins, Victoria E. (November 17, 2019). "Turning Back the Clock? Violence against Women and the Trump Administration". Victims & Offenders. 14 (8): 965–978. doi:10.1080/15564886.2019.1671284.
- Stephens-Dougan, LaFluer (May 2021). "The Persistence of Racial Cues and Appeals in American Elections". Annual Review of Political Science. 24: 301–320. doi:10.1146/annurev-polisci-082619-015522. ISSN 1094-2939.
- Sundahl, Anne-Mette Holmgård (May 4, 2022). "Personality Cult or a Mere Matter of Popularity?". International Journal of Politics, Culture, and Society. 36 (4): 431–458. doi:10.1007/s10767-022-09423-0. PMC 9066393. PMID 35528318.
- Urbinati, Nadia (May 2019). "Political Theory of Populism". Annual Review of Political Science. 22: 111–127. doi:10.1146/annurev-polisci-050317-070753. ISSN 1094-2939.
