= Rhyme-as-reason effect =

Type of cognitive bias

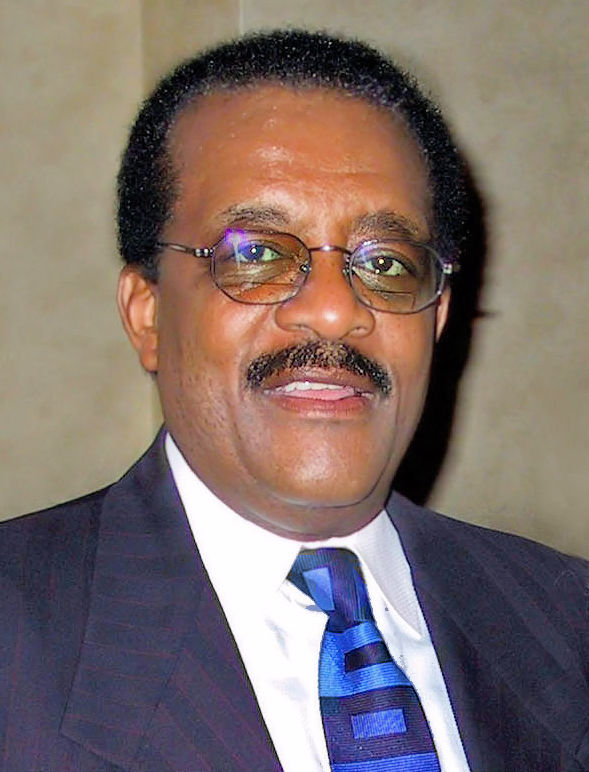
In the murder trial of O. J. Simpson, in 1995, Simpsons defence lawyer Johnnie Cochran memorably summed up 'if [the glove] doesn't fit, you must acquit', contrary to the prosecution case.

The rhyme-as-reason effect, sometimes erroneously known as the Eaton–Rosen phenomenon, is a cognitive bias where sayings or aphorisms are perceived as more accurate or truthful when they rhyme.

In experiments, participants evaluated variations of sayings that either rhymed or did not rhyme. Those that rhymed were consistently judged as more truthful, even when the meaning was controlled for. For instance, the rhyming saying "What sobriety conceals, alcohol reveals" was rated as more accurate on average than its non-rhyming counterpart, "What sobriety conceals, alcohol unmasks," across different groups of subjects (each group assessed the accuracy of only one version of the statement).

This effect may be explained by the "Keats heuristic", which suggests that people assess a statement's truth based on its aesthetic qualities. Another explanation is the fluency heuristic, which says that statements are preferred due to their ease of cognitive processing.

The rhyme-as-reason effect is sometimes referred to as the "Eaton–Rosen phenomenon" in non-scientific literature. This term may have originated when the term was inserted into the Wikipedia article about the effect by an anonymous user as “alternative nomenclature” without citations in July 2013.

== Studies and theories ==
The 2000 study, Birds of a Feather Flock Conjointly(?): Rhyme as Reason in Aphorisms, investigates the influence of rhyme on the creation and perception of aphorisms. The study concludes that rhyming aphorisms are more memorable and persuasive, acting as a heuristic that enhances their impact.

Research on the "chiastic structure," a type of linguistic structure that rearranges phrasing in an aesthetically pleasing way, demonstrates its effectiveness in increasing the perceived accuracy of statements. This higher perceived truthfulness is likely due to the memorable and coherent nature of chiastic structures.

In the study A Reason to Rhyme: Phonological and Semantic Influences on Lexical Access, participants exposed to rhyming primes in a verbal sentence completion task responded faster than those exposed to non-rhyming primes. This indicates that rhyme enhances lexical access, making rhymed sayings more memorable and acceptable.

Moreover, people often rely on heuristics, such as "reputable sources make true assertions" or "familiar sayings are believable," especially when lacking the expertise or motivation to thoroughly evaluate a message. This reliance is typically subconscious, suggesting that under certain conditions, people may equate the ease of rhyming with the truthfulness of a message.

== Keats heuristics ==
The Keats heuristics illustrate how poetic structure influences the perception of a line of words, highlighting a broader concept of how aesthetics impact our judgments. Named after the poet John Keats, this references his famous line, "Beauty is truth, truth beauty – that is all / Ye know on earth, and all ye need to know," an aphorism celebrated for its poetic beauty and philosophical depth. This heuristic suggests that people may partially base their assessments of a statement's truthfulness on its aesthetic attributes.

Experimental results show that participants consistently rated rhyming aphorisms as more agreeable and truthful than non-rhyming ones, even when the content was identical or the rhyming content lacked logical validity. This effect is strongest when the poetic qualities, such as fluency from rhyming, closely align with the perceived truthfulness of the semantic content.

Therefore, it can be inferred that the presence of rhyme within an aphorism's poetic structure acts as a cue to deeper meaning. People prefer rhymes for their "pleasurable aesthetics," as the rhyme creates a sense of unity and coherence, increasing the aphorism's appeal, repeatability, and memorability. This cognitive bias is often explained by fluency heuristics, where the ease of processing a rhyming statement enhances its perceived truthfulness.

== Fluency heuristics ==
The fluency heuristic is defined as the tendency to attribute higher value to objects or phrases that are more easily retrieved or processed. According to this heuristic, the perceived value of a phrase is linked to how quickly and effortlessly it is processed. Rhymed sayings typically exhibit higher fluency, making them easier to retrieve and process, which leads to the assumption that they have greater value.

People do not always make decisions based on rational analysis or declarative knowledge. Instead, the ease of processing can result in more positive evaluations of aphorisms. Stimuli that are processed with difficulty tend to feel psychologically distant and are perceived in a more abstract manner. Conversely, the most appealing choices are often those that are the simplest to process.

For example, cities with names that are processed smoothly are perceived as closer than those with names that are processed less fluently. This preference for fluency explains why rhymed sayings are often judged as more truthful and agreeable: their ease of cognitive processing makes them more appealing and credible.

== Real world implications ==
The phenomenon may make rhymes particularly effective in advertising. However, the quality of the rhymes is seen as crucial for determining their trustworthiness. To ensure that customers accept claims automatically and without deep analysis, marketing messages should be as fluent as possible.

In early childhood education, the phonological resemblance found in nursery rhymes may lead young children to focus more on phonological elements than on semantic ones, negatively affecting short-term memory retention. This may be because phonetic processing creates fleeting memory traces, or because it does not facilitate "transfer-appropriate" information to long-term memory, making it difficult for children to grasp the sentences' meanings. The "rhyme-as-reason" effect may therefore result in superficial processing that is inadequate for semantic comprehension in children's cognitive development.

In a legal court room context, rhymes can enhance jurors' retention and implementation of attorneys' instructions, potentially biasing the outcomes.

== Criticisms ==
Despite the prevalence of well-known rhyming aphorisms (e.g., "A friend in need is a friend indeed"), critics argue that participants may favor these not for their rhyming properties, but because they subconsciously associate them with the accumulated wisdom of the ages. Questionnaires that focused on the content of advertising slogans found no significant difference in the perceived credibility of rhymes versus non-rhymes.

Additionally, the effect is influenced by the level of attention allocated to content. When participants in experiments were explicitly instructed to distinguish between poetic structure and semantic content, the perceived truthfulness of rhymes was significantly reduced. Similar reductions in the effect were observed when participants had pre-existing opinions about the aphorisms.

Furthermore, the frequency and recency of exposure to strongly correlate with retrieval fluency, linking back to fluency heuristics. This suggests that the effect may be more about enhanced processing fluency, which arises from repeated exposure or environmental factors such as fluency manipulations, rather than the presence of rhyme itself. These factors create greater familiarity and ease of recall, contributing to the perceived truthfulness of the statements.
