= Newspeak in Russia =

Usage of euphemisms by Russian state media and officials

Newspeak in Russia refers to the systematic substitution of euphemisms by Russian state media and officials to shape public perception, obscure realities, and reinforce government narratives. Drawing inspiration from George Orwell’s dystopian concept in Nineteen Eighty-Four, the term describes both historical Soviet bureaucratic jargon and the contemporary propaganda substitution by the Kremlin.

== Etymology ==
The Russian term novoiaz emerged in the late 20th century, first appearing in major Russian dictionaries around 1998. It was defined as the language of the Soviet period, characterized by ideological weight and cumbersome bureaucratic phrasing, directly translated from Orwell's Newspeak by V. Golyshev in Russian editions of Nineteen Eighty-Four.

== Historical Usage ==
During the Soviet era, novoiaz encompassed heavy bureaucratic expressions, euphemisms, and circumlocutions that masked political realities. Terminology such as "socialist reconstruction" or "providing for the people" often concealed coercive policies.

== Modern Newspeak ==
Russian Newspeak has started to be used more in the context of the Russian invasion of Ukraine. Actions are reframed with opposite connotations: cities under occupation by Russian forces are described as "liberated," transforming the notion of occupation into one of freedom. State media outlets coordinate messaging with Kremlin directives, ensuring a uniform narrative across all channels. "Fact‑checking" operations like "War on Fakes" are employed to legitimize state propaganda by discrediting independent sources and reinforcing official versions of events.

=== Common Euphemisms ===
- "Special Military Operation" (специальная военная операция / SVO) - Russian state media refers to the invasion of Ukraine as a "special operation".
- "Liberated Territories" vs "Occupied Territories" - Territories under Russian control are framed as "liberated" despite international consensus calling them "occupied".
- Gesture of Goodwill (жест доброй воли) - Reframing withdrawal in strategic defeats (e.g. Snake Island) as benevolent acts.
- "Boom" (хлопок) or "gas kick" (хлопок газа). Used instead of "explosion" or "blast".

=== Effects ===
The intended outcomes include minimising public alarm by avoiding harsh terms like "explosion" or "war", creating semantic alignment that supports Kremlin narratives and silences dissent, and encouraging self-censorship among citizens whose speech is monitored and penalized for using "wrong" terms. Leveraging Orwellian "doublethink" via constructs like "liberation" for invasion, confusing public discourse.

== See also ==
- Newspeak
- Doublespeak
- Firehose of falsehood – Russian-style high-volume disinformation campaign
- Propaganda in Russia
