= Milner (surname) =

Milner is an English and Scottish occupational surname for a miller, and is related to the surname Miller. Notable people with the surname include:

== In arts and entertainment ==
- Andrew Milner (born 1950), British-Australian cultural theorist and literary critic
- Edward Milner (1819–1884), English landscape architect
- John Milner (magician) (born 1948), British magician, stage and TV performer
- Martin Milner (1931–2015), American actor
- Martin Milner (violinist) (1928–2000), British violinist

== In business ==
- H. R. Milner (1889–1975), Canadian lawyer and businessman
- John T. Milner (1826–1898), American engineer and businessman
- Yuri Milner (born 1961), Israeli-Russian entrepreneur

== In government, politics and activism ==
- Alfred Milner, 1st Viscount Milner (1854–1925), British colonial administrator
- James Milner, 1st Baron Milner of Leeds (1889–1967), British politician
- Thirman L. Milner (1933–2024), American politician
- Thomas Milner (politician) (died 1694), English emigrant to the Virginia colony
- Yeshimabeit Milner, American technologist and African American activist

== In religion ==
- Isaac Milner (1750–1820), English don, clergyman and mathematician
- John Milner (bishop) (1752–1826), English Roman Catholic bishop and writer
- John Milner (nonjuror) (1628–1702), English clergyman

== In science and academia ==
- Allison Milner (1983–2019), Australian disability, mental health and suicide researcher
- Andrew Milner (born 1950), British-Australian cultural theorist and literary critic
- Brenda Milner (born 1918), English-Canadian neuropsychologist
- Eric Charles Milner (1928–1997), English mathematician and set theorist
- Helen Milner (born 1958), American political scientist
- James Milner (art historian) (1874–1927), British art executive
- Jean-Claude Milner (born 1941), French philosopher and linguist
- Marion Milner (1900–1998), British psychoanalyst and journal writer
- Peter Milner (1919–2018), British-Canadian neuroscientist
- Robin Milner (1934–2010), British computer scientist
- Stephen Milner, British scholar of Italian

== In sport ==
- Andy Milner (born 1967), English footballer
- Hoby Milner (born 1991), American baseball player
- James Milner (born 1986), English footballer
- Jim Milner (1933–2017, as James Edward Milner), English footballer
- John Milner (1949–2000), American baseball player
- John Milner (footballer) (born 1942), English footballer
- Marcus Milner (cricketer) (1864–1939), English racehorse trainer, soldier, civil servant and cricketer
- Martrez Milner (born 1984), American football player
- Tommy Milner (born 1986), American racing driver
- Tommy Milner (rugby league) (fl. 1910s), English rugby league player

== In other fields ==
- Frank Milner (1875–1944), New Zealand secondary school head-master
- James Milner, 9th Seigneur of Sark (died 1730), British nobleman

== Fictional characters ==
- John Milner, in the 1973 film American Graffiti
- Tommy Milner, in the 2019 film Scary Stories to Tell in the Dark
- Milner, in the 2013 British television series "Utopia (British TV series)"

== See also ==
- Eric Milner-White (1884–1963), English cleric
- Milnor
