= Rolf Reber =

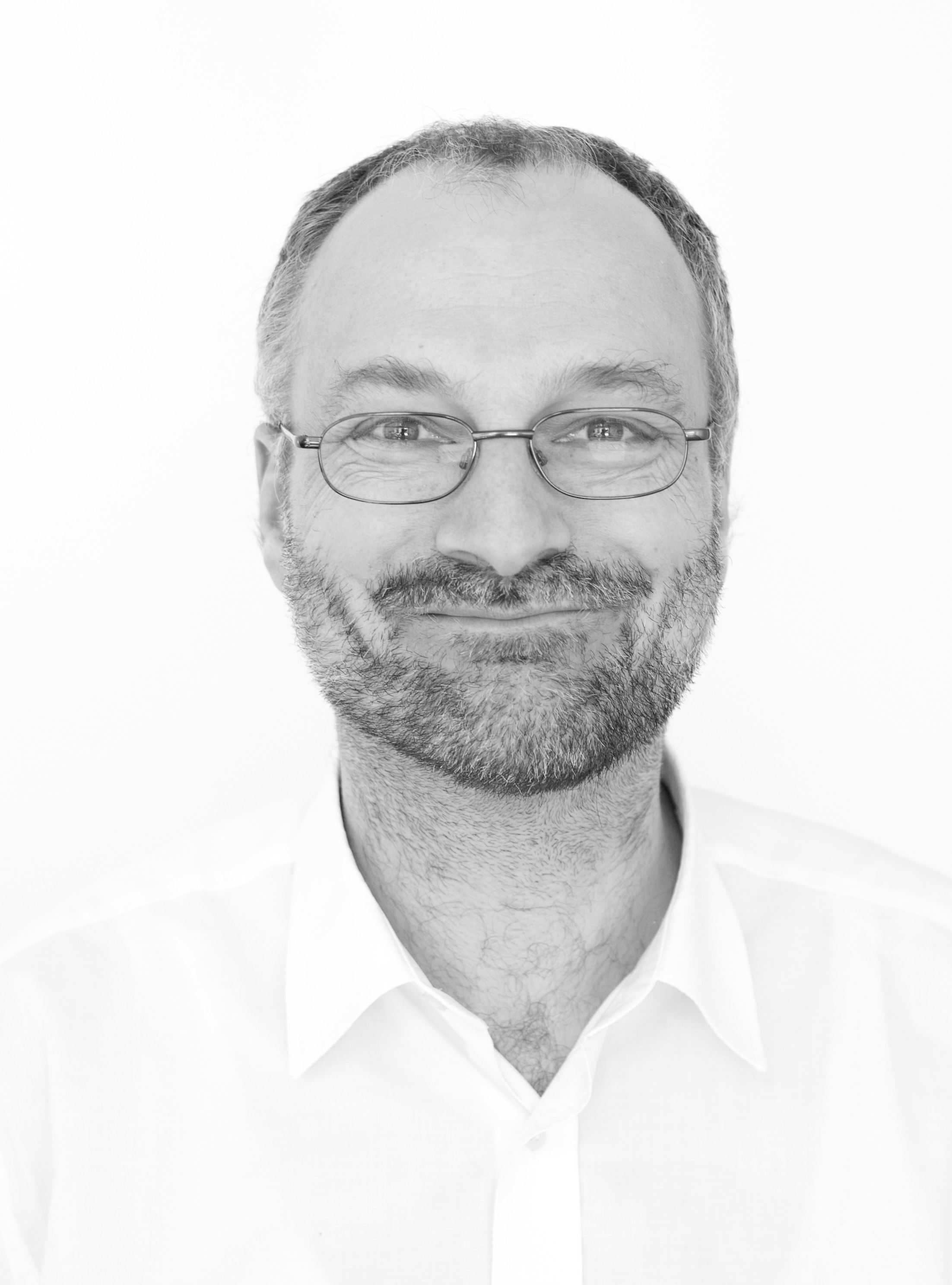
- Born: 17 May 1959 (age 67); Basel, Switzerland
- Known for: Processing fluency theory of aesthetic pleasure
- Scientific career
- Fields: Psychology
- Workplaces: University of Oslo

Rolf Reber (born 17 May 1959) is a professor of psychology at the University of Oslo.

== Research ==
Rolf Reber is known for his research on processing fluency, especially the processing fluency theory of aesthetic pleasure he developed together with Norbert Schwarz from the University of Michigan and Piotr Winkielman from the University of California at San Diego. The core assumption of the theory is that an audience draws aesthetic pleasure from the fact that an object can be processed easily, especially if a viewer remains unaware of the source of this processing ease.

== Theory resolution ==
This theory resolves an apparent contradiction between the uniformity of musical preferences in infants and the cultural differences in musical tastes in adults. Infants prefer consonant melodies because newborns share biological mechanisms that make them process consonance in music more easily than dissonance. When children grow up, they are exposed to the music of their culture, explaining why individuals from different cultures have different musical tastes. In addition, the research found that processing fluency influences both affect and the judged truth of statements, suggesting that ease of processing is a common underlying experience in both perceived beauty and judged truth.

== Observation ==
This observation fits anecdotal observations that mathematicians and scientists sometimes use the beauty of a theorem as an indication of its truth. This idea has been explored in more recent work. Processing fluency and its effects can help explain the "Aha"-experience. The processing fluency theory of aesthetic pleasure has influenced work in psychology, philosophy, marketing, and finance. An extension of the processing fluency theory takes account of the fact that many artworks are difficult to process. Nevertheless, audiences interpret these artworks in a meaningful way and like them.

== Instructional technique ==
More recently, Rolf Reber and his collaborators have developed and explored Example Choice, an instructional technique designed to increase relevance and student interest in learning abstract principles in mathematics and science. Students are given examples from different topics that all address the same underlying principle, and a student has to choose the example that interests him or her most. The chosen example is then used to explain the formal principle. This technique is supposed to connect the formal principle to students' interest. Research has shown that students become more interested and spend more time learning the principle when they can choose an example than when they are given an example.

== Author ==
Rolf Reber is the author of the book Critical Feeling that introduces the concept of critical feeling which extends the notion of critical thinking and two popular science books in German, among them Kleine Psychologie des Alltäglichen (A brief psychology of everyday life) which has been translated into Norwegian, Korean and Chinese.
