= Reber (disambiguation) =

Reber may refer to:

- Reber, German last name

== Places ==
=== Slovenia ===
- Reber, Žužemberk
- Reber pri Škofljici
