= Reber =

Reber is a last name of German origin. It is derived from two sources: First, it is "an occupational name for a vine-dresser or vintner, from Middle High German rebe 'vine' + -er agent suffix." Second, it comes "from a Germanic personal name, Radobert, formed with rād, rāt 'counsel', 'advice' + berht 'bright'". In the United States, persons with the last name Reber primarily live in Pennsylvania; there are also large numbers in Ohio, California, Minnesota, Utah. Montana and Colorado. Notable people with the surname include:

- Arthur S. Reber, American cognitive psychologist
- Clark L. Reber, American politician
- Deborah Reber, American writer
- Gerhard Reber, German organizational theorist
- Grote Reber, American pioneer of radio astronomy
- James Q. Reber, second Deputy Director of the National Reconnaissance Office
- John Reber, American politician
- Napoléon Henri Reber, French musician and composer
- Robert Reber, American politician from Pennsylvania
- Rolf Reber, Norwegian cognitive psychologist
- Stephen C. Reber, American Episcopal bishop

== Other ==
- Reber (automobile), an early American motor car manufacturer
