= Sublime (literary) =

Use of uniquely-evocative language

The sublime in literature refers to the use of language and description that excites the senses of the reader to a degree that exceeds the ordinary limits of that individual's capacities.

== Origin ==
The earliest text on the sublime was written sometime in the first or third century AD by the Greek writer (pseudo-) Longinus in his work On the Sublime (Περὶ ὕψους, Perì hýpsous). Longinus defines the literary sublime as "excellence in language", the "expression of a great spirit" and the power to provoke "ecstasy" in one's readers. Longinus holds that the goal of a writer should be to produce a form of ecstasy.

"Sublimity refers to a certain type of elevated language that strikes its listener with the mighty and irresistible power of a thunderbolt. A sublime passage can be heard again and again with equal pleasure."

Longinus additionally defines the ideal audience for the sublime, which needs to be refined and cultivated. According to Longinus, only such an audience is able to judge the relative sublimity of a work. This attitude can be seen as inherently aristocratic, given that the audience Longinus desires must be free from the low and vulgar thoughts that generally accompany rustic toil. It became central to neoclassicism and remained largely unchallenged until the Romantic Age.

Nicolas Boileau-Despréaux introduced the sublime into modern critical discourse in the Preface to his translation of Longinus: Traite du Sublime de Longin (1674). The literary concept of the sublime emerged in the seventeenth century from its use in alchemy, and acquired importance in the eighteenth century. Its development during this period is shown in the work of James Beattie's Dissertations Moral and Critical, which explored the origin of the term. The sublime is also associated with the 1757 treatise by Edmund Burke, though it had earlier roots. The idea of the sublime was taken up by Immanuel Kant and by Romantic poets, including William Wordsworth and Samuel Taylor Coleridge.

== Burke ==
Although preceded by John Baillie's 1747 An Essay on the Sublime, most scholars point to Edmund Burke's A Philosophical Inquiry into the Origin of Our Ideas of the Sublime and Beautiful (1757) as the landmark treatise on the sublime. It describes how one's interactions with the physical world affect the formulation of ideals related to beauty and art. Burke defined the sublime in this text as "whatever is fitted in any sort to excite the ideas of pain and danger... Whatever is in any sort terrible, or is conversant about terrible objects, or operates in a manner analogous to terror." Burke believed that the sublime was something that could provoke terror in the audience, for terror and pain were the strongest of emotions. However, he also believed there was an inherent "pleasure" in this emotion. Anything that is great, infinite or obscure could be an object of terror and the sublime, for there was an element of the unknown about them. Burke finds more than a few instances of terror and the sublime in John Milton's Paradise Lost, in which the figures of Death and Satan are considered sublime. Burke also provided the philosophical distinction between what is sublime and what is beautiful. He stated that the latter includes those that are well formed and aesthetically pleasing while the sublime possesses the power to compel and destroy.

== Kant ==
Immanuel Kant in his The Critique of Judgment (1790) further clarifies Burke's definition of the sublime, mostly in contrast to the beautiful. He says that the beautiful in nature is not quantifiable, but rather focused only in color, form, surface, etc. of an object. Therefore, the beautiful is to be "regarded as a presentation of an indeterminate concept of understanding." However, to Kant, the sublime is more infinite and can be found even in an object that has no form. The sublime should be regarded as a "presentation of an indeterminate concept of reason". Basically, Kant argues that beauty is a temporary response of understanding, but the sublime goes beyond the aesthetics into a realm of reason. While Burke argues that the sublime arises from an object that incites terror, Kant says that an object can be terrifying and thus sublime, without the beholder actually being afraid of it. However, there is much more to Kant's definition of the sublime. He argues that the sublime in itself is so great that anything compared to it must necessarily be considered small. And, because of that, an important aspect of the sublime is the work of one's imagination to comprehend something so great that it seems inconceivable; thus, one major aspect of the sublime is the power of mankind's mind to recognize it. Kant transforms the sublime from a terrifying object of nature to something intricately connected to the rational mind, and hence to morality.

The literary sublime, as well as the philosophical, aesthetic sublimes, is inherently connected to nature but, as with most literary terms, the sublime evolved alongside literature. More authors began to connect the natural sublime to an internalized emotion of terror. Authors began to see the sublime, with its inherent contradictions (pain and pleasure, terror and awe) as representative of the changing political and cultural climate of the times. They began to incorporate more aspects of the sublime into their literary works as a way of externalizing their inner conflicts. In this way, the sublime particularly appealed to the Romantics.

== In English romantic poetry ==
The fascination with the sublime in Romanticism first began in landscaping; however, Romantic poets soon began experimenting on it as well. But the innovations made to the sublime in landscaping also translated into the poetry of the time. Thus, what Christian Hirschfeld wrote in his Theorie der Gartenkunst (trans. Theory of Gardening, 1779–1780) can be applied to the literary world as well. On the sublime, Hirschfeld argues that man sees his own potential in the grandeur of nature and in the boundless landscapes therein. He also believed that this applied to both man's freedom and lack thereof, and moving from restriction to freedom results in an inner elevation. In this way, the sublime becomes internalized, and "physical grandeur [becomes] transformed into spiritual grandeur". Hirschfeld further believed that the sublime of the nature then becomes a symbol of inner human realities.

So the English Romantics began to view the sublime as referring to a "realm of experience beyond the measurable" that is beyond rational thought, that arises chiefly from the terrors and awe-inspiring natural phenomena. Others agreed with Kant's definition of the sublime: that it had everything to do with mankind's rational thought and perceptions. But all Romantics agreed that the sublime was something to be studied and contemplated. And in doing so, the Romantics internalized their thoughts of the sublime and attempted to understand it. Although the moment may have been fleeting, the Romantics believed one could find enlightenment in the sublime. Each of the Romantics had a slightly different interpretation on the sublime.

=== William Wordsworth ===
William Wordsworth is the Romantic best known for working with the sublime. Many scholars actually place Wordsworth's idea of the sublime as the standard of the romantic sublime. In his essay on the sublime, Wordsworth says that the "mind [tries] to grasp at something towards which it can make approaches but which it is incapable of attaining". In trying to "grasp" at this sublime idea, the mind loses consciousness, and the spirit is able to grasp the sublime—but it is only temporary. Wordsworth expresses the emotion that this elicits in his poem Lines Composed a Few Miles above Tintern Abbey:

Of aspect more sublime; that blessed mood,
In which the burden of the mystery
In which the heavy and weary weight
Of all this unintelligible world,
Is lightened (37-41).

Here Wordsworth expresses that in the mood of the sublime, the burden of the world is lifted. In a lot of these cases, Wordsworth finds the sublime in Nature. He finds the awe in the beautiful forms of nature, but he also finds terror. Wordsworth experiences both aspects of the sublime. However, he does go beyond Burke or Kant's definition of the literary sublime, for his ultimate goal is to find Enlightenment within the sublime.

=== Samuel Taylor Coleridge ===
Samuel Taylor Coleridge was a poet, critic and scholar, and he was very concerned with the sublime, especially in contrast to the beautiful. Coleridge argues his view best when he says that:

I meet, I find the Beautiful - but I give, contribute or rather attribute the Sublime. No object of the Sense is sublime in itself; but only as far as I make it a symbol of some Idea. The circle is a beautiful figure in itself; it becomes sublime, when I contemplate eternity under that figure.

Therefore, the speaker must contemplate more than just the object itself; it is sublime in its greater context. Now, Coleridge's views on the sublime are unique because Coleridge believed that Nature was only occasionally sublime, that is, only in the sky, the sea and the desert, because those are the only objects in nature that are boundless. For this reason, Coleridge's "Rime of the Ancient Mariner" is often considered sublime, though it is one of the few works in which Coleridge expresses the natural world as being sublime. In most of Coleridge's other works, he focuses on the "metaphysical sublime," which is found in the 'in between's of the world (earth and sea, sky and sea, etc.). But Coleridge didn't demand the sensation of terror or awe within the sight, rather, he focused on the element of infinity.

== Later aspects ==
The so-called "second generation" Romantics employed the sublime as well, but as the early Romantics had different interpretations of the literary sublime, so too did Percy Bysshe Shelley, Lord Byron, and John Keats. In many instances, they reflected the desire for Enlightenment that their predecessor showed, but they also tended to stick closer to the definition of the sublime given by Longinus and Kant. They tended to focus on the terror in the sublime, and the ecstasy found there.

== Lasting effects ==
The literary sublime found in Romantic poetry left a lasting impression on writers for generations. The Victorians may not have used the term sublime, but a similar emotional state can be found within their writings. The Irish poet William Butler Yeats referred to a similar concept of "tragic joy". Sigmund Freud took the literary sublime and examined the psyche behind it, resulting in what he termed "sublimation". Other authors who used the sublime after the Romantic period included Charles Dickens, William Butler Yeats, among many others. The sublime has also been described as a key to understanding the sense of wonder concept in science fiction literature, and in connection with Kenneth Burke's rhetorical aesthetic theory of form.

In early modernist discourse, the urban landscape became an important subject of the sublime. The rise of skyscrapers and large cities became a center of focus of writers, and, although they did focus on some natural aspects, the definition of the sublime took a slight turn. Christophe Den Tandt says that "the moment of sublime terror is always to some extent a social construct". Den Tandt focuses on the politics of the sublime and the issue of legitimacy, discussing if the urban landscape is a form of reality because the city cannot be viewed as a single natural design. Rather, the man made aspects of it make an object of uncertainty and thus, terror and the sublime.

In addition, the feminist movement used their own definition of the sublime in literature. Barbara Claire Freeman believes that the so-called "feminine" sublime does not attempt to dominate and master the feeling of terror that the "masculine" or "dominating" sublime does. Instead, they accept the feeling of rapture and attempt to delve into its "metaphysical" secrets and aspects. Freeman believes that the domestication of the sublime, which is typically associated with femininity, is not the only aspect, and often is not even found, in women's literature.

== See also ==
- Sublime (philosophy)
