= Flood the zone =

Political propaganda technique

"Flood the zone" is a political strategy in which a political figure aims to gain media attention, disorient opponents and distract the public from undesirable reports by rapidly forwarding large volumes of newsworthy information to the media. The strategy has been attributed to U.S. President Donald Trump's former chief political strategist Steve Bannon.

The strategy came to public light after Bannon told Michael Lewis in 2018 that "The Democrats don't matter... The real opposition is the media. And the way to deal with them is to flood the zone with shit". Trump adopted the strategy during the 2016 presidential election, followed by other right-wing political figures such as Éric Zemmour and Elon Musk.

== History ==
=== Usage by Stephen Miller ===
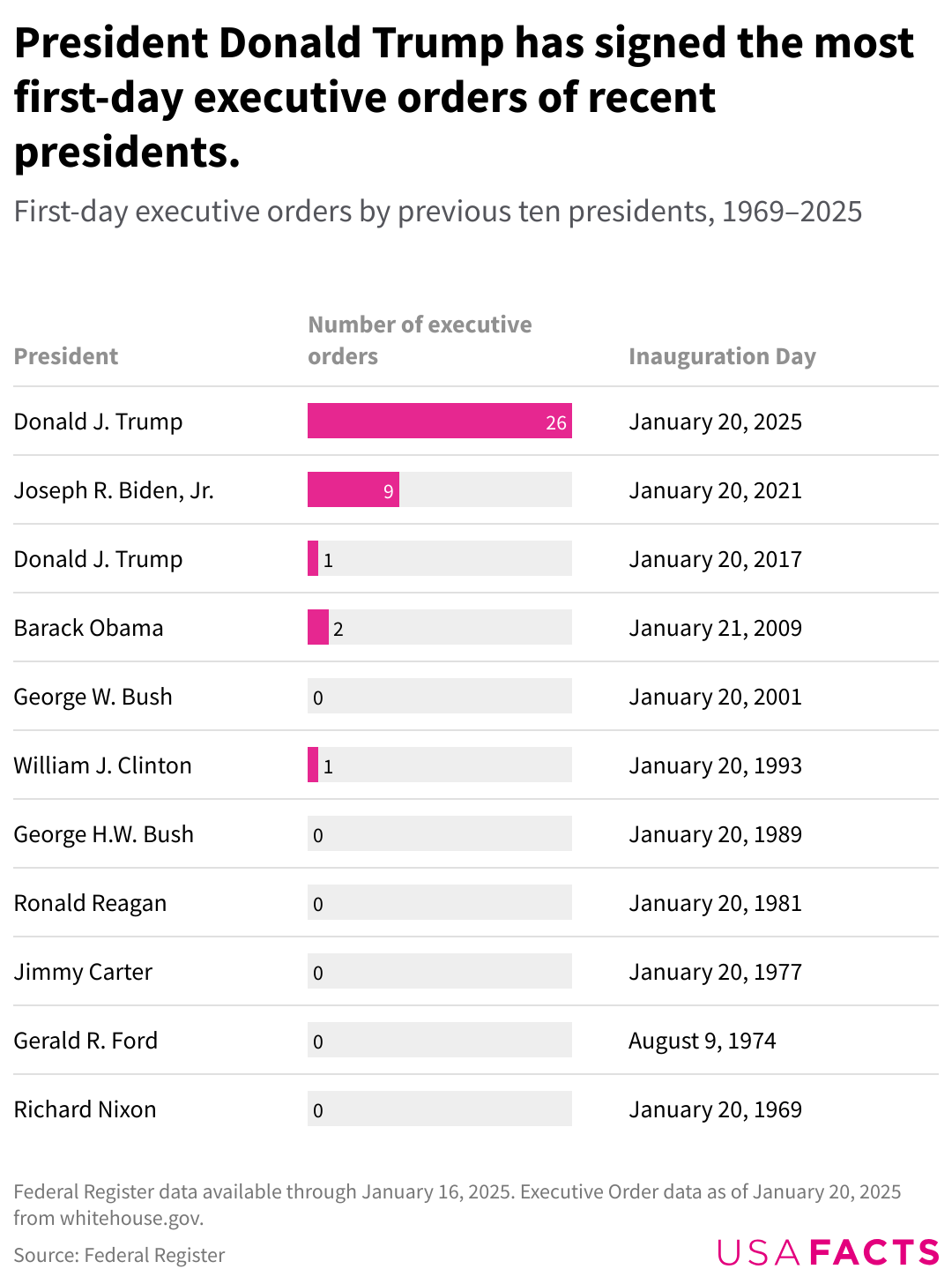
Comparisons between numbers of first-day executive orders

The beginning of Trump's second presidency is largely recognized as the one theorized by political strategist Steve Bannon, here deployed by Stephen Miller. The administration had already prepared diverse executive orders to allow the signing of 55 executive orders in 20 days, which frequency is never-before-seen.

=== Reactions by Democrats ===
During Trump's second term, Democrats began adopting Bannon's strategy. Democratic leader and representative Maxwell Frost called for the party to "flood the zone" by "Communicat[ing] often, all the time, about what’s going on with a very simple message that the reason [Republicans] want to cut Medicaid, the reason they want to cut food stamps, is because they want to give billionaires a tax cut".

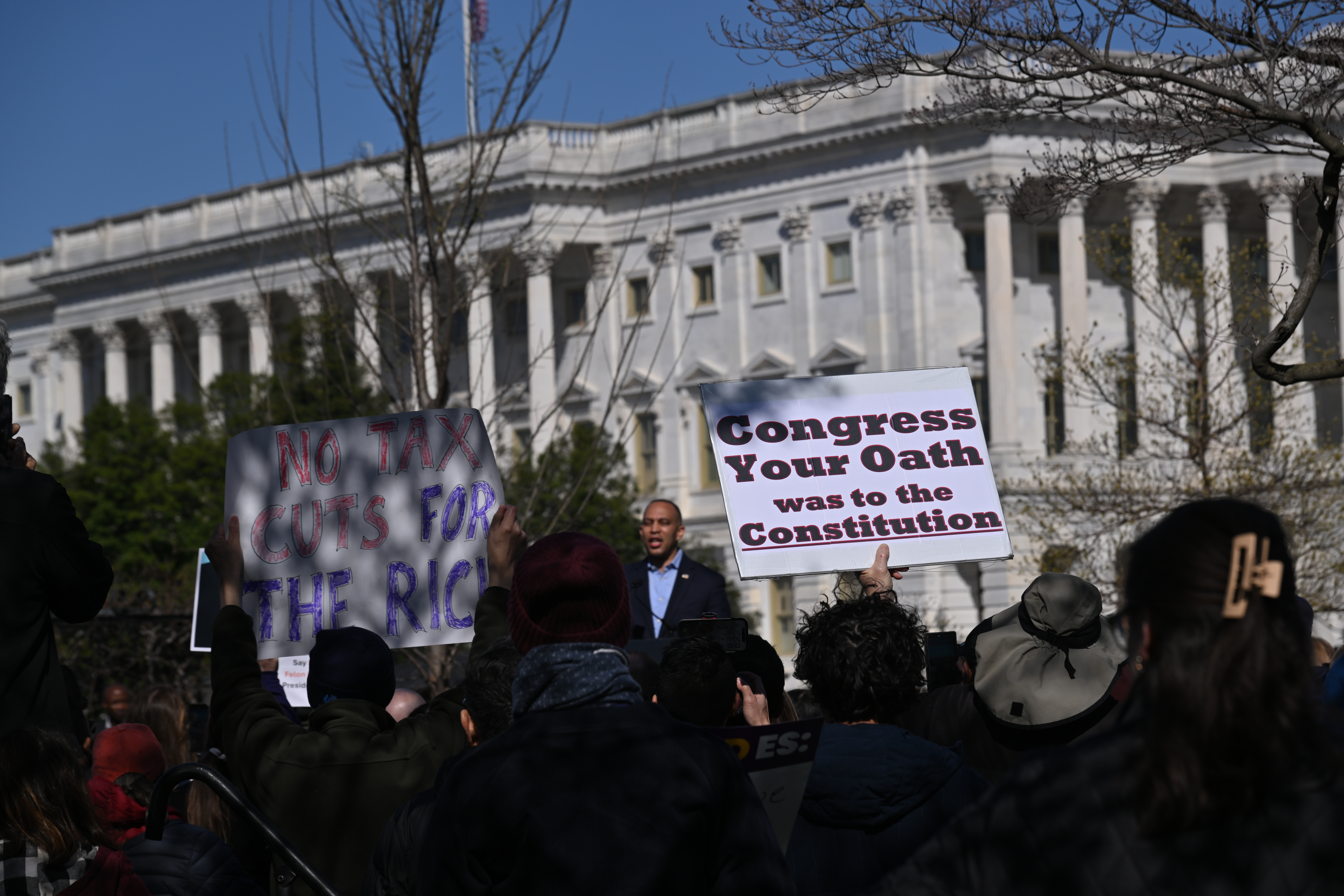
Jeffries speaking at the U.S. Capitol in March 2025

Democratic House leader Hakeem Jeffries called for the party to adopt a "more is more" strategy and be more active on social media. He also began holding more press conferences at the Capitol and appearances on podcasts.

== See also ==
- Attention economy – Economic view of human attention as a commodity
- Big lie – Propaganda technique
- Firehose of falsehood – Propaganda technique
- Gish gallop, a person in a debate attempts to overwhelm an opponent by rapidly presenting an excessive number of arguments, without regard for their accuracy or strength
- Madman theory – Feature of U.S. president Richard Nixon's foreign policy
