= Milnor =

Milnor is a surname, and may refer to:

- James Milnor (1773–1845), American politician
- John Milnor (born 1931), American mathematician
- Kristina Milnor, American classical scholar
- William Milnor (1769–1848), American politician

== See also ==
- Milner (surname)
