= Sense of wonder =

Awe-inspiring aesthetic experience evoked by expanded awareness

In science fiction journalism, a sense of wonder (sometimes comically written as sensawunda) is a specific, often desirable, intellectual and emotional state evoked in the reader by the genre.

== Definitions ==
In Brave New Words: The Oxford Dictionary of Science Fiction the term sense of wonder is defined as follows:

SENSE OF WONDER n. a feeling of awakening or awe triggered by an expansion of one's awareness of what is possible or by confrontation with the vastness of space and time, as brought on by reading science fiction.

The phrase "sense of wonder" is widely referred to in the context of science fiction, although the concept is applicable just as well to a broader usage. Jon Radoff has characterised a sense of wonder as an emotional reaction to the reader suddenly confronting, understanding, or seeing a concept anew in the context of new information.

In the introductory section of his essay 'On the Grotesque in Science Fiction', Istvan Csicsery-Ronay Jr., Professor of English, DePauw University, states:

The so-called sense of wonder has been considered one of the primary attributes of sf at least since the pulp era. The titles of the most popular sf magazines of that period—Astounding, Amazing, Wonder Stories, Thrilling, Startling, etc.—clearly indicate that the putative cognitive value of sf stories is more than counter-balanced by an affective power, to which, in fact, the scientific content is expected to submit.

John Clute and Peter Nicholls associate the experience with that of the "conceptual breakthrough" or "paradigm shift" (Clute & Nicholls 1993). In many cases, it is achieved through the recasting of previous narrative experiences in a larger context. It can be found in short scenes (e.g., in Star Wars (1977), it can be found, in a small dose, inside the line "That's no moon; it's a space station.") and it can require entire novels to set up (as in the final line to Iain Banks's Feersum Endjinn.)

George Mann defines the term as "the sense of inspired awe that is aroused in a reader when the full implications of an event or action become realized, or when the immensity of a plot or idea first becomes known;" and he associates the term with the Golden Age of SF and the pulp magazines prevalent at the time. One of the major writers of the Golden Age, Isaac Asimov, agreed with this association: in 1967 commenting on the changes occurring in SF he wrote,

And because today's real life so resembles day-before-yesterday's fantasy, the old-time fans are restless. Deep within, whether they admit it or not, is a feeling of disappointment and even outrage that the outer world has invaded their private domain. They feel the loss of a "sense of wonder" because what was once truly confined to "wonder" has now become prosaic and mundane.

== As a concept especially connected with science fiction ==
George Mann suggests that this 'sense of wonder' is associated only with science fiction as distinct from science fantasy, stating:

It is this insistence on fundamental realism that has caused Verne's novels to be retrospectively seen as of key importance in the development of SF. ...—people in droves came to the books looking for adventure and got it, but with an edge of scientific inquiry that left them with a new, very different sense of wonder. The magic of the realms of fantasy had been superseded by the fascination of speculation rooted in reality.

However, the editor and critic David Hartwell sees SF's 'sense of wonder' in more general terms, as "being at the root of the excitement of science fiction". For Hartwell, "Science fiction's appeal lies in combination of the rational, the believable, with the miraculous."

Academic criticism of science fiction literature (Robu 1988) identifies the idea of the sublime described by Edmund Burke and Immanuel Kant—infinity, immensity, "delightful horror"—as a key to understanding the concept of "sense of wonder" in science fiction. For example, Professor of English at the University of Iowa, Brooks Landon says:

Reference to this "sense of wonder", a term appropriated and popularized by Damon Knight, appear over and over in twentieth-century discussions of SF and may at least in part reflect SF's debt to its Gothic and Romantic forerunners.

Brian Aldiss and David Wingrove's history of science fiction, Trillion Year Spree, also invokes Gothic horror and the concept of the sublime. Paul K. Alkon does likewise in his book on science fiction before 1900, arguing that science fiction provides a way to "achieve sublimity without recourse to the supernatural."

Edward James, in a section of his book entitled 'The Sense of Wonder' says on this point of the origin of the 'sense of wonder' in SF:

That the concept of the Sublime, a major aesthetic criterion of the Romantic era, has a close connection with the pleasures derived from reading sf has long been recognized by readers and critics, even if that word has seldom been used. The phrase that has been used, and which to a large extent corresponds, is 'Sense of Wonder' (sometimes jocularly or cynically abbreviated to 'sensawunda'). The very first collection of sf criticism was Damon Knight's In Search of Wonder (1956).

James goes on to explore the same point as made by David Hartwell in his book Age of Wonders (and quoted above) as regards the relationship of the 'sense of wonder' in SF to religion or the religious experience. He states that:

...in doing so, it [science fiction] can create a rival sense of wonder, which acts almost as a replacement religion: a religion for those deprived of all traditional certainties in the wake of Darwin, Einstein, Plank [sic], Godel, and Heisenberg.

As an example James takes the short story 'The Nine Billion Names of God' by Arthur C. Clarke. He explains:

A computer is installed by Western technicians in a Tibetan lamasery; its task is in to speed up the compilation of all the possible names of God. This, the monks believe, is what the human race was created for, and on its completion the earth, and perhaps all creation, will come to an end. The technicians do their job, with some condescension, and flee back to civilization.

'Wonder if the computer's finished its run. It was due about now.'

Chuck didn't reply, so George swung round in his saddle. He could just see Chuck's face, a white oval toward the sky.

'Look,' whispered Chuck, and George lifted his eyes to heaven. (There is always a last time for everything.)

Overhead, without any fuss, the stars were going out.

...what this reader (at the age of 13 or 14) learned from the story was the unimaginable size of the universe and the implausibility of some of the traditional human images of God. An almost religious sense of awe (or wonder) was created in me, as I tried to perceive the immensity of the universe, and contemplate the possibility of the non-existence of God.

Others have opined that Clarke "has dedicated his career to evoking a "sense of wonder" at the sublime spaces of the universe..." and cited his novels like Childhood's End and Rendezvous with Rama in that regard.

Kathryn Cramer in her essay 'On Science and Science Fiction' also explores the relationship of SF's 'sense of wonder' to religion, stating that "The primacy of the sense of wonder in science fiction poses a direct challenge to religion: Does the wonder of science and the natural world as experienced through science fiction replace religious awe?"

However, as Brooks Landon shows, not all 'sense of wonder' needs to be so closely related to the classical sense of the Sublime. Commenting on the story 'Twilight' by John W. Campbell he says:

...Campbell stresses how long seven million years is in human terms but notes that this time span is nothing in the life of the sun, whose "two thousand thousand thousand" risings ... As Campbell well knew, one sure path to a sense of wonder was big numbers."

Despite the attempts above to define and illustrate the 'sense of wonder' in SF, Csicsery-Ronay Jr. argues that "unlike most of the other qualities regularly associated with the genre, the sense of wonder resists critical commentary." The reason he suggests is that,

A "literature of ideas," as sf is often said to be, invites discussion of ideas; but the sense of wonder seems doubly to resist intellectual investigation. As a "sense," it is clearly not about ideas and indeed seems in opposition to them; wonder even more so, with its implications of awe that short-circuits analytic thought.

Nevertheless, despite this "resistance to critical commentary," the 'sense of wonder' has "a well-established pedigree in art, separated into two related categories of response: the expansive sublime and the intensive grotesque." Csicsery-Ronay Jr. explains the difference between these two categories as follows:

The sublime is a response to an imaginative shock, the complex recoil and recuperation of consciousness coping with objects too great to be encompassed. The grotesque, on the other hand, is a quality usually attributed to objects, the strange conflation of disparate elements not found in nature. This distinction is true to their difference. The sublime expands consciousness inward as it encompasses limits to its outward expansion of apprehension; the grotesque is a projection of fascinated repulsion/attraction out into objects that consciousness cannot accommodate, because the object disturbs the sense of rational, natural categorization. In both cases, the reader/perceiver is shocked by a sudden estrangement from habitual perception, and in both cases the response is to suspend one's confidence in knowledge about the world, and to attempt to redefine the real in thought's relation to nature. Both are concerned with the states of mind that science and art have in common: acute responsiveness to the objects of the world, the testing (often involuntary) of the categories conventionally used to interpret the world, and the desire to articulate what consciousness finds inarticulable.

Later in this same essay the author argues that "the sublime and the grotesque are in such close kinship that they are shadows of each other," and that "it is not always easy to distinguish the two, and the grotesque of one age easily becomes the sublime of another." He gives as an example the android (T-1000) in the second 'Terminator' film Terminator 2: Judgment Day, saying that "The T-1000, like so many liminal figures in sf, is almost simultaneously sublime and grotesque. Its fascinating shape-shifting would be the object of sublime awe were it not for its sadistic violation of mundane flesh."

== Natural vs synthetic origin ==
Sharona Ben-Tov in her book The Artificial Paradise: Science Fiction and American Reality explores science-fiction's (SF) 'sense of wonder' from a feminist perspective. Her book is a "thought-provoking work of criticism that provides a new and interesting perspective on some basic elements in science fiction," including the 'sense of wonder'. In his review of Ben-Tov's work for the SF critical journal Extrapolation David Dalgleish, quoting from the text, points out that:

Ben-Tov asserts that SF's (in)famous "sense of wonder" is an attempt to evoke a sublime transcendence, achieved through Nature, and "Nature is an animate, feminine, and numinous being" (23). But in SF as Ben-Tov sees it, this natural transcendence is merely an illusion; in fact, the transcendent is only achieved through technology, achieved by alienating feminine Nature. SF has "appropriated the qualities of abundance and harmony from the romance's Earthly paradise, banishing the figure of feminine nature from the man-made, rationalized world ...(22) ... The SF ideology that Ben-Tov examines is rooted in the scientific revolution, in the changing view of nature—from living, feminine Mother, Nature becomes inert, dead matter. This twentieth-century ideology has, for Ben-Tov, disturbing implications, especially from a feminist standpoint. "Our society," writes Ben-Tov, "lost the basis for transcendent experience by losing the relationship with numinous nature"(23). Thus, SF's "sense of wonder" is a lie: "it reflects white American fantasies about nature, machines, and the 'frontier' . . . . The American mythological apparatus must be comprehended thoroughly to be handled, or dismantled, effectively" (92–93).

== See also ==
- Wonder (emotion)
- Sublime (literary)
- Numinousity
- Overview effect
- Processing fluency theory of aesthetic pleasure

== Bibliography ==
- Clute, John; Peter Nicholls (1993). The Encyclopedia of Science Fiction (2nd ed.). New York: St. Martin's Press.
- Moskowitz, Sam (1974). Immortal Storm: A History of Science Fiction Fandom. New York: Hyperion Books.
- Robu, Cornel (Spring 1988). "A Key to Science Fiction: the Sublime". Foundation (42): 21–37.
