= Allison Milner =

Australian social epidemiologist (1983–2019)

Allison Joy Milner (1 May 1983 Melbourne, Australia - 12 August 2019 Melbourne, Australia) was a social epidemiologist specializing in workplace mental health. Milner was Deputy Head of the Disability and Health Unit at the Centre for Health Equity, Melbourne School of Population and Global Health (MSPGH) at the University of Melbourne.

== Education ==
Milner attended the Brisbane Girls' Grammar School, subsequently undertook her undergraduate study at the Griffith University, Queensland, obtaining a bachelor's in psychology (with honours). Following this, Milner achieved a PhD at Griffith University in the Australian Institute of Suicide Research and Prevention Department, in the field of globalisation and suicide. After her PhD, Allison received a master's degree in epidemiology at the University of Melbourne.

== Career ==
In 2012, Milner started her role as a postdoctoral research at the Melbourne School of Population and Global Health. Milner continued this role for multiple years, before her employment at Deakin University between 2015 and 2016. Milner was co-chair of the Suicide and the Workplace Special Interest Group for the International Association for Suicide Prevention, and In 2015, Milner also become the national academic director at MATES in Construction. She then returned to the University of Melbourne, however as a senior lecturer in 2016 before her promotion in 2018, with Milner becoming an associate professor. In 2017, Milner received a state government fellowship to investigate the high incidence of suicide amongst working men. During her career, she established mentorship programs for early career researchers at Deakin University, the University of Melbourne, and the Centre of Research Excellence in Disability and Health (CRE-DH).

Milner published over 150 papers in the areas of psychosocial behaviors, mental health and suicide.

In 2019 at the age of 36, Milner was killed by a falling elm tree in Princes Park.

The University of Melbourne and the Faculty of Medicine, Dentistry and Health Sciences established the Allison Milner Early Career Research Fellowship to honour Milner's legacy. The fellowship supports early-career researchers working in the area of public health and health equity.

== Awards ==
- 2014 AIPS Tall Poppy Award
- 2017 Griffith Health Outstanding Alumni Award for Outstanding Higher Degree Research Health Alumnus of the Year (Australian Institute for Suicide Research and Prevention-AISRAP)
- 2019 Posthumous recipient of the 2019 Dame Kate Campbell Fellowship
