= Misconception =

Misconception may refer to:

- List of common misconceptions
  - Scientific misconceptions
- "Misconception" (Law & Order), an episode of Law & Order
- Misconception (film), a 2014 documentary film directed by Jessica Yu
