= Mere-exposure effect =

Psychological phenomenon

The mere-exposure effect is a psychological phenomenon by which people tend to develop a liking or disliking for things merely because they are familiar with them. In social psychology, this effect is sometimes called the familiarity principle. The effect has been demonstrated with many kinds of things, including words, Chinese characters, paintings, pictures of faces, geometric figures, and sounds. In studies of interpersonal attraction, the more often people see a person, the more pleasing and likeable they find that person.

== Research ==
Gustav Fechner conducted the earliest known research on the effect in 1876. Edward B. Titchener also documented the effect and described the "glow of warmth" felt in the presence of something familiar; however, his hypothesis was thrown out when results showed that the enhancement of preferences for objects did not depend on the individual's subjective impressions of how familiar the objects were. The rejection of Titchener's hypothesis spurred further research and the development of current theory.

The scholar best known for developing the mere-exposure effect is Robert Zajonc. Before conducting his research, he observed that exposure to a novel stimulus initially elicits a fear/avoidance response in all organisms. Each subsequent exposure to the novel stimulus causes less fear and more interest in the observing organism. After repeated exposure, the observing organism will begin to react fondly to the once novel stimulus. This observation led to the research and development of the mere-exposure effect.

=== Zajonc (1960s–1990s) ===
In the 1960s, a series of Robert Zajonc's laboratory experiments demonstrated that simply exposing participants to a familiar stimulus led them to rate it more positively than other, similar stimuli that had not been presented before. At first, Zajonc looked at language and the frequency of words used. He found that overall positive words were used more than their negative counterparts. Later, he showed similar results for liking, pleasantness, and forced-choice measures from a variety of stimuli, such as polygons, drawings, photographs of expressions, nonsense words, and idiographs.

In 1980, Zajonc proposed the affective primacy hypothesis: that affective reactions (such as liking) can be "elicited with minimal stimulus input." Through mere-exposure experiments, Zajonc sought to provide evidence for the affective-primacy hypothesis, namely that affective judgments are made without prior cognitive processes. He tested this hypothesis by presenting repeated stimuli to participants at suboptimal thresholds such that they did not show conscious awareness or recognition of the repeated stimuli (when asked whether they had seen the image, responses were at chance level), but continued to show affective bias toward the repeatedly exposed stimuli. Zajonc compared results from primes exposed longer, which allowed for conscious awareness, to stimuli shown so briefly that participants did not show conscious awareness. He found that the primes shown more briefly and not recognized prompted faster responses for liking than primes shown at conscious levels.

One experiment to test the mere-exposure effect used fertile chicken eggs. Tones of two different frequencies were played to different groups of chicks while they were still unhatched. Once hatched, each tone was played to both groups of chicks. Each set of chicks consistently chose the tone prenatally played to it.

Another experiment exposed two groups of people to Chinese characters for short times. Participants were then told that these symbols represented adjectives and were asked to rate whether the symbols held positive or negative connotations. The symbols the participants had previously seen were consistently rated more positively than those they had not. In a similar experiment, people were not asked to rate the connotations of the symbols, but to describe their mood after the experiment. Members of the group with repeated exposure to certain characters reported being in better moods than those without.

In yet another variation, participants were shown an image on a tachistoscope for a very brief duration that could not be perceived consciously. This subliminal exposure produced the same effect, though subliminal effects are unlikely to occur without controlled laboratory conditions.

According to Zajonc, the mere-exposure effect is capable of taking place without conscious cognition, and "preferences need no inferences". This claim has spurred much research in the relationship between cognition and affect. Zajonc explains that if preferences (or attitudes) were based merely on information units with affect attached to them, then persuasion would be fairly simple. He argues that this is not the case: such simple persuasion tactics have failed miserably. Zajonc states that affective responses to stimuli happen much more quickly than cognitive responses, and that these responses are often made with much more confidence. He states that thought (cognition) and feeling (affect) are distinct, and that cognition is not free from affect, nor is affect free of cognition: that "the form of experience that we came to call feeling accompanies all cognitions, that it arises early in the process of registration and retrieval, albeit weakly and vaguely, and that it derives from a parallel, separate, and partly independent system in the organism."

According to Zajonc, there is no empirical proof that cognition precedes any form of decision-making. While this is a common assumption, Zajonc argues it is more likely that decisions are made with little to no cognition. He equates deciding upon something with liking it, meaning that we cognize reasons to rationalize a decision more often than deciding upon it. In other words, we make judgments first, and then seek to justify them by rationalization.

=== Goetzinger (1968) ===
Charles Goetzinger conducted an experiment using the mere-exposure effect on his class at Oregon State University. Goetzinger had a student come to class in a large black bag with only his feet visible. The black bag sat on a table in the back of the classroom. Goetzinger's experiment was to observe if the students would treat the black bag in accordance to Zajonc's mere-exposure effect. His hypothesis was confirmed. The students in the class first treated the black bag with hostility, which over time turned into curiosity, and eventually friendship. This experiment confirms Zajonc's mere-exposure effect, by simply presenting the black bag over and over again to the students their attitudes were changed, or as Zajonc states "mere repeated exposure of the individual to a stimulus is a sufficient condition for the enhancement of his attitude toward it."

=== Bornstein (1989) ===
A meta-analysis of 208 experiments found that the mere-exposure effect is robust and reliable, with an effect size of r=0.26. This analysis found that the effect is strongest when unfamiliar stimuli are presented briefly. Mere exposure typically reaches its maximum effect within 10–20 presentations, and some studies even show that liking may decline after a longer series of exposures. For example, people generally like a song more after they have heard it a few times, but many repetitions can reduce this preference. A delay between exposure and the measurement of liking actually tends to increase the strength of the effect. The effect is weaker on children, and for drawings and paintings as compared to other types of stimuli. One social psychology experiment showed that exposure to people we initially dislike makes us dislike them even more.

=== Zola–Morgan (2001) ===
In support of Zajonc's claim that affect does not need cognition to occur, Zola–Morgan conducted experiments on monkeys with lesions to the amygdala (the brain structure that is responsive to affective stimuli). In his experiments, Zola–Morgan proved that lesions to the amygdala impair affective functioning, but not cognitive processes. However, lesions in the hippocampus (the brain structure responsible for memory) impair cognitive functions but leave emotional responses fully functional.

=== Montoya et al. (2017) ===
These authors reviewed evidence that with sufficient repetitions the ascending curve for liking turns down (in the form of an inverted-U). The evidence goes back at least thirty years.

== Perceptual fluency ==
The mere-exposure effect posits that repeated exposure to a stimulus increases perceptual fluency, the ease with which a stimulus can be processed. Perceptual fluency, in turn, increases positive affect. Studies showed that repeated exposure increases perceptual fluency, confirming positive affect in autobiographical memory and perceptual learning, a finding supported in later studies.

== Application ==
=== Advertising ===
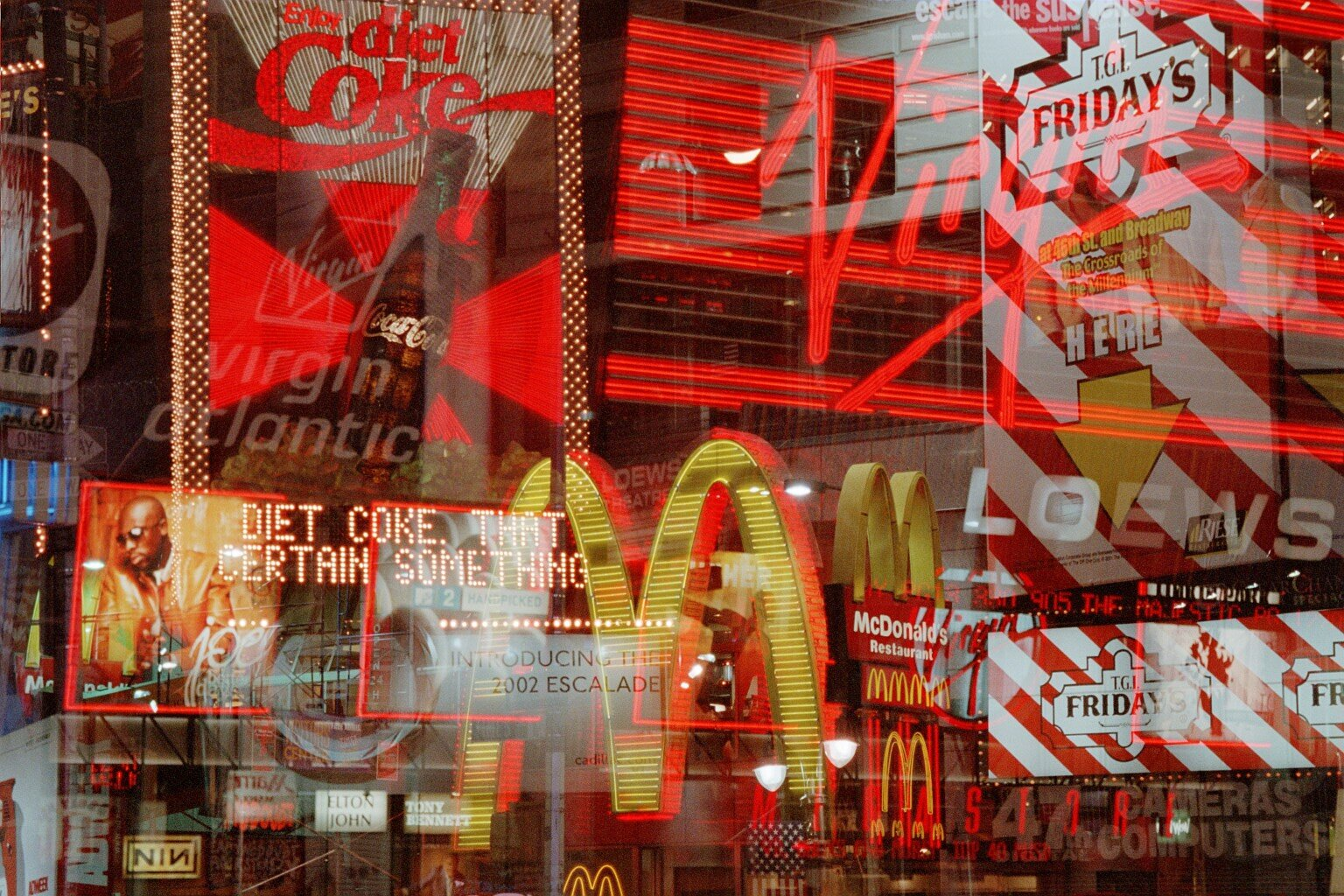
A collage of advertising displays in Times Square, New York, circa 2002

The most obvious application of the mere-exposure effect is in advertising, but research on its effectiveness at enhancing consumer attitudes toward particular companies and products has been mixed. One study tested the mere-exposure effect with banner ads on a computer screen. College-age students were asked to read an article on the computer while banner ads flashed at the top of the screen. The results showed that the students exposed to the "test" banner rated the ad more favorably than other ads shown less frequently or not at all. This research supports the mere-exposure effect.

A different study showed that higher levels of media exposure are associated with lower reputations for companies, even when the exposure is mostly positive. A subsequent review of the research concluded that exposure leads to ambivalence because it brings about a large number of associations, which tend to be both favorable and unfavorable. Exposure is most likely to be helpful when a company or product is new and unfamiliar to consumers. An "optimal" level of exposure to an advertisement may not exist. In a third study, experimenters primed consumers with affective motives. One group of thirsty consumers was primed with a happy face before being offered a beverage, while a second group was primed with an unpleasant face. Those primed with the happy face bought more beverages, and were also willing to pay more for the beverage than their unhappy counterparts. This study bolsters Zajonc's claim that choices are not in need of cognition. Buyers often choose what they "like" instead of what they have substantially thought about.

In the advertising world, the mere-exposure effect suggests that consumers need not think about advertisements: simple repetition is enough to make a "memory trace" in the consumer's mind and unconsciously affect their consuming behavior. One scholar explained this relationship as follows: "The approach tendencies created by mere exposure may be preattitudinal in the sense that they do not require the type of deliberate processing that is required to form brand attitude."

=== Other areas ===
The mere-exposure effect exists in most areas of human decision-making. For example, many stock traders tend to invest in securities of domestic companies merely because they are more familiar with them, even though international markets offer similar or better alternatives. The mere-exposure effect also distorts the results of journal-ranking surveys; academics who previously published or completed reviews for a particular academic journal rate it dramatically higher than those who did not. There are mixed results on the question of whether mere exposure can promote good relations between different social groups. When groups already have negative attitudes to each other, further exposure can increase hostility. A statistical analysis of voting patterns found that candidates' exposure has a strong effect on the number of votes they receive, distinct from the popularity of their policies.

== See also ==
- Contact hypothesis – Psychological hypothesis about intergroup contact
- Endowment effect – Cognitive bias
- Illusory truth effect – Repeating a falsity increases believability
- Interpersonal attraction – Study of the attraction between people that leads to friendship or romance
- Propinquity effect – Physical or psychological proximity between people
- Subliminal advertising – Sensory stimuli below an individual's threshold for conscious perception
- Black Bag – 2026 novel based on Goetzinger's 1968 experiment
