= James Q. Reber =

Second Deputy Director of the National Reconnaissance Office
- In office September 1, 1965 – June 30, 1969
- President: Lyndon B. Johnson/Richard M. Nixon

Personal details
- Born: July 16, 1911 Elizabethtown, Pennsylvania, U.S.
- Died: January 16, 2003 (aged 91) Washington, D.C., U.S.

James Q. Reber (July 16, 1911 – January 16, 2003) was the second deputy director of the National Reconnaissance Office.

Reber earned a Doctor of Philosophy degree in International Relations at the University of Chicago in 1939. In 1943, he began his government career with State Department, as a foreign affairs and economic specialist. He later joined the Central Intelligence Agency in 1950, and did various planning and coordination activities until 1957.

In 1955, Reber became the Chairman of the Ad Hoc Requirements Committee, thereby assuming a major leadership role in the national reconnaissance community. The committee developed prioritized lists of intelligence requirements and U-2 targets during overflights of the Soviet Union. When the committee was taken over by the United States Intelligence Board in 1960 and renamed the Committee on Overhead Reconnaissance, he continued as chairman. The committee's activities eventually morphed into prioritizing targets for early imaging satellite missions.

Reber served as deputy director of the National Reconnaissance Office from 1 September 1965 to 30 June 1969. He was instrumental in fostering an effective working relationship between the Central Intelligence Agency and Department of Defense in the early days of the National Reconnaissance Office and the National Reconnaissance Program. After his time at the National Reconnaissance Office, Dr. Reber became the chairman of the United States Intelligence Board's Signals Intelligence Committee, retiring from government service in July 1972.

Reber was also an amateur photographer and outdoorsman whose 1974 book, Potomac Portrait, collects together his photographs taken while hiking and kayaking the furthest reaches of the Potomac River.

Reber died on January 16, 2003.
