= Processing fluency theory of aesthetic pleasure =

Theory in psychological aesthetics

The processing fluency theory of aesthetic pleasure is a theory in psychological aesthetics on how people experience beauty. Processing fluency is the ease with which information is processed in the human mind.

== Overview ==
The theory is based on four basic assumptions:

1. Objects differ in the fluency with which they can be processed. Variables that facilitate fluent processing include objective features of stimuli, like goodness of form, symmetry, figure-ground contrast, as well as experience with a stimulus, like repeated exposure or prototypicality.
2. Processing fluency is itself hedonically marked (that is, it possesses an inherent affective quality) and high fluency is subjectively experienced as positive.
3. In line with the "feelings-as-information" account, processing fluency feeds into judgments of aesthetic appreciation because people draw on their subjective experience in making evaluative judgments, unless the informational value of the experience is called into question.
4. The impact of fluency is moderated by expectations and attribution. On one hand, fluency has a particularly strong impact on affective experience if there are no expectations (that is, its source is unknown and fluent processing comes as a surprise). On the other hand, the fluency-based affective experience is discounted as a source of relevant information when the perceiver attributes the experience to an irrelevant source. This helps explain the inverted U-shaped function often found in research on the effect of complexity on preferences: very complex patterns are not judged as beautiful because they are disfluent, and patterns are judged as more beautiful when they become less complex. When viewers perceive a simple pattern, they are often able to detect the source of fluency—the pattern's simplicity—and do not use this experience of ease for judging the beauty of the pattern.

The processing fluency theory of aesthetic pleasure emphasizes the interaction between the viewer and an object in that it integrates theories and a wide range of empirical evidence that focus on effects of objective stimulus attributes on perceived beauty with those that emphasize the role of experience, for example by invoking prototypicality. In this theory, beauty is seen as an experience that has nothing to do with artistic merit: Beautiful works of art may be without any merit whereas good art is not necessarily beautiful.

The theory resolves the apparent paradox of inborn and acquired preferences. For instance, infants prefer consonant melodies. According to the fluency account, this is because infants share perceptual equipment that make them process consonance in music more easily than dissonance. When children grow up, they are exposed to the music of their culture, resulting in culture-specific musical fluency. This familiarization explains why individuals from different cultures have different musical tastes. In addition, the theory helps explain why beauty (in a wide sense; perhaps the term elegance is more apt) is a cue for truth in mathematical problem solving and scientific discovery.

The theory and its implications have influenced theory and research in the psychology of perception, cognitive psychology, social psychology, empirical aesthetics, web design, marketing, finance, and archeology.

== See also ==
- Elegance
- Implicit Association Test
- Neuroesthetics
- Sense of wonder
