= Processing fluency =

Ease with which the brain processes information

In cognitive psychology, processing fluency is the ease with which information is processed by the brain. It is commonly treated as a synonym for cognitive fluency, a term used to describe the subjective experience of ease or difficulty associated with mental tasks. Processing fluency influences a range of judgments and decisions, including perceptions of truth, attractiveness, familiarity, and confidence.

Several subtypes of processing fluency have been identified. Perceptual fluency refers to the ease of processing sensory stimuli, which can be affected by factors such as visual clarity, contrast, or exposure duration. Retrieval fluency involves the ease with which information is accessed from memory.

Higher fluency is often associated with more favorable evaluations, even when the ease of processing is unrelated to the content itself, a cognitive bias known as the fluency heuristic.

== Research ==
Research in cognitive neuroscience and psychology has shown that processing fluency influences different kinds of judgments. For instance, perceptual fluency can contribute to the experience of familiarity when fluent processing is attributed to the past. Repeating the presentation of a stimulus, also known as priming, is one method for enhancing fluency. Jacoby and Dallas in 1981 argued that items from past experience are processed more fluently. This becomes a learned experience throughout our lifetime such that fluent items can be attributed to the past. Therefore, people sometimes take fluency as an indication that a stimulus is familiar even though the sense of familiarity is false. Perceptual fluency literature has been dominated with research that posits that fluency leads to familiarity. Behavioral measures of fluency do not have the temporal resolution to properly investigate the interaction between fluency and familiarity. Event-related potentials (ERPs) are a method of averaging brainwaves that has been successful in dissociating different cognitive mechanisms due to small time scale that brainwaves are measured. One study was able to use a manipulation of visual clarity to change perceptual fluency during a recognition task. This manipulation effected ERPs for fluency and familiarity at different times and locations in the brain, leading them to believe that these two mechanisms do not come from the same source.

Further evidence has shown that artificial techniques can be used to trick people into believing they have encountered a stimulus previously. In one experiment, participants were presented symbols which consisted of highly familiar symbols, less familiar symbols and novel symbols. Participants were required to report whether they had encountered any of the symbols presented before the experiment. A 35 millisecond flash preceded each symbol, in which the same, different or no symbol was flashed. It was found that the brief flash of stimulus boosted the fluency of the target item. When the same symbol was flashed, participants' ratings of having encountered the symbol previously increased. This example illustrates that fluent processing can induce a feeling of familiarity.

Fluency and familiarity have been shown to lead to the mere exposure effect. Research has found that repetition of a stimulus can lead to fluent processing which leads to a feeling of liking. In this experiment, participants were presented with unfamiliar faces either three or nine times. After presentation, pairs of faces were shown to participants, each consisting of an old and new face. Results showed that participants gave higher rates of liking to the repeated faces. The mere exposure effect is eliminated if fluent processing is disrupted. Topolinski et al. (2014) explained that the fluency created by pronunciation plays a vital role in increasing fondness for a stimulus. In the experiment, participants were shown unfamiliar adverts in a cinema. The control group watched the adverts with a sugar cube in their mouth. Therefore, there was no interference in pronunciation in the control group. The experimental group watched the adverts whilst eating popcorn, which meant there was oral interference. One week later, participants rated their liking of products. In the control group, the mere exposure effect was observed, where old products had higher ratings than new products. In the experimental group, the mere exposure effect was abolished by interfering with fluency of pronunciation during presentation of stimulus.

Later research observed that high perceptual fluency increases the experience of positive affect. Research with psychophysiological methods corroborated this positive effect on affective experience: easy-to-perceive stimuli were not only judged more positively but increased activation in the zygomaticus major muscle, the so-called "smiling muscle". The notion that processing fluency is inherently positive led to the processing fluency theory of aesthetic pleasure, and it has been used to explain people's negative reactions towards migrants, who appear to be more difficult to process than non-migrants.

Research relating to processing fluency and product design has shown that when the form of a product is highly unusual, it becomes difficult to process and is viewed less favourably than fluent counterparts. There is significant evidence that when consumers are presented with multiple choices, they will view objects more positively and more aesthetically pleasing when surrounded by congruent imagery. While consumers enjoy a moderate source of incongruity, too much disorder and unfamiliarity lead to feelings of being overwhelmed. Fluent product design has shown to encourage consumers to engage in approach activities such as touching and spending extended time viewing the product.

Other studies have shown that when presenting people with a factual statement, manipulations that make the statement easier to mentally process—even totally nonsubstantive changes like writing it in a cleaner font or making it rhyme or simply repeating it—can alter judgment of the truth of the statement, along with evaluation of the intelligence of the statement's author. This is called the "illusion of truth effect". Multiple studies have found that subjects were more likely to judge easy-to-read statements as true. This means that perceived beauty and judged truth have a common underlying experience, namely processing fluency. Indeed, experiments showed that beauty is used as an indication for the correctness of mathematical solutions. This supports the idea that beauty is intuitively seen as truth. Processing fluency may be one of the foundations of intuition and the "Aha!" experience.

The truth effect can be induced by colour differences in statements as well. In a study, participants were presented with statements, some of which were true and the rest being false. Half these statements were presented in high contrast colours and the other half were presented in low contrast colours. Independent of truth, participants judged the high contrast statements as true. Participants were also quicker to make judgements about the high contrast statements compared to the low contrast statements. The contrast differences in statements increased fluency.

Fluency has been shown to affect judgements of humour. In one study, participants were presented with jokes which were in easy to read or hard to read fonts. Participants were asked to rate which jokes they believed were more humorous. Participants gave higher ratings to jokes in easy to read fonts. It has been predicted that the jokes in easy to read fonts feel fluent, as they are easier to pronounce and this results in higher ratings. The fluent processing has been misattributed to the humour of the statement.

As high processing fluency indicates that the interaction of a person with the environment goes smoothly, a person does not need to pay particular attention to the environment. By contrast, low processing fluency means that there are problems in the interaction with the environment which requires more attention and an analytical processing style to solve the problem. Indeed, people process information more shallowly when processing fluency is high and employ an analytical thinking style when processing fluency is low.

A 2010 study demonstrated that the long-known effect of illegible handwriting in an essay on grading is mediated by a lack of processing fluency (and not, for example, negative stereotypes related to illegible writing).

== Applications ==
Basic research on processing fluency has been applied to marketing, to business names, and to finance. For example, psychologists have determined that, during the week following their IPO, stocks perform better when their names are fluent/easy to pronounce and when their ticker symbols are pronounceable (e.g., KAG) vs. unpronounceable (e.g., KGH).

== See also ==
- Familiarity heuristic
- Fluency heuristic
- Illusion-of-truth effect
- Mere-exposure effect
