= Firehose of falsehood =

Propaganda technique

The firehose of falsehood, also known as firehosing, is a propaganda technique in which a large number of messages are broadcast rapidly, repetitively, and continuously over multiple channels (like news and social media) without regard for truth or consistency. The firehose of falsehood is a contemporary model for Russian propaganda under Russian President Vladimir Putin.

Though similar in some ways, the American tactic of "flooding the zone" with misleading or false statements is distinct from firehosing in that flooding involves pushing out initiatives and policies at an overwhelming rate, rather than specifically falsehoods. The tactics may be combined.

While difficult to counter, the German Marshall Fund, RAND, and military strategists have described techniques to respond to the firehose of falsehood, generally involving preempting it with good information, strategically reducing or removing misinformation, and teaching digital literacy.

== Description ==
The RAND Corporation coined the name "firehose of falsehood" in 2016, describing a technique it observed in Russian propaganda that combines a very large number of communications and disregard for the truth. Partially, it is distinguished from the older Soviet propaganda techniques used during the Cold War by the much larger quantity of messages and channels enabled by the advent of the internet and changes in how people consume news information.

According to research published in Frontiers in Political Science:

When leaders employ a firehose of falsehoods, citizens retreat into cynicism and the belief that the truth is fundamentally unknowable. If the truth is unknowable, reasoned debate is pointless because there are no agreed-upon facts. ... When reasoned democratic discourse is not possible because there are no agreed upon facts, all that is left is the political exercise of raw power.

Use of the firehose of falsehood has been shown to be "consistent with political psychology research showing that epistemic and existential uncertainty motivate the adoption of conservative and authoritarian beliefs."

The immediate aim of the firehose of falsehood technique is to entertain, confuse, and overwhelm the audience and to create disinterest in or opposition to fact-checking and accurate reporting, so the propaganda may be delivered to the public more quickly than better sources. The approach's success flouts the conventional wisdom that communication is more persuasive when it is truthful, credible, and non-contradictory.

According to RAND, the firehose of falsehood model has four distinguishing factors:

1. It is high-volume and multichannel.
2. It is rapid, continuous, and repetitive.
3. It lacks a commitment to objective reality.
4. It lacks commitment to consistency.

The high volume of messages, the use of multiple channels, and the use of internet bots and fake accounts are effective because people are more likely to believe a story when it appears to have been reported by multiple sources. For example, in addition to the recognizably-Russian news source RT, Russia disseminates propaganda using dozens of proxy websites whose connection to RT are "disguised or downplayed". People also are more likely to believe a story when they think many others believe it, especially if those others belong to a group with which they identify. Thus, a group of operatives can influence a person's opinion by creating the false impression that a majority of that person's neighbors support a given view.

== Campaigns ==
=== Russia ===
The Russian government has used the "firehose of falsehood" at least as early as its Russo-Georgian War in 2008. It has continued to use it in its war with Ukraine, including the annexation of Crimea and the prelude to the Russian invasion of Ukraine. There also have been Russian campaigns targeting other "near abroad" post-Soviet states and the three Baltic states of Lithuania, Latvia, and Estonia.

It continued to use it as part of its interference in the 2016 United States elections.

Firehosing also has been a feature of Russian disinformation campaigns targeting Western Europe and the United States, including as part of the interference in the 2016 United States elections. In 2019, according to the science writer William J. Broad of The New York Times, the propaganda network RT America began a "firehose of falsehood" campaign to convince Americans that 5G phones were a health hazard, even as Putin was ordering the launch of 5G networks in Russia.

=== United States ===
Steve Bannon, Trump's 2016 presidential campaign CEO and chief strategist during the first seven months of Trump's first presidency, said that the press, rather than Democrats, was Trump's primary adversary and "the way to deal with them is to flood the zone with shit." In February 2025, a public relations CEO stated that the "flood the zone" tactic was designed to make sure no single action or event stands out above the rest by having them occur at a rapid pace, thus preventing the public from keeping up and preventing controversy or outrage over a specific action or event.

According to Mother Jones magazine editor Monika Bauerlein, the firehose technique is increasingly being used against the press by American politicians. She warns readers to expect an increase in the use of several related tactics: the lawsuit threat, the "fake news" denial, and the ad hominem attack.

Several publications have characterized the communication strategy of Donald Trump as a firehose of falsehood. His use of the firehose technique during the June 27, 2024, debate broadcast by CNN was noted by analysts such as Heather Cox Richardson, who labeled Trump's performance as Gish galloping, and Dan Froomkin, who provided a similar analysis.

The technique has also been used by activists, such as by the anti-vaccine movement to spread debunked theories about the supposed dangers of vaccination.

=== Other ===
- According to the author and former military intelligence officer John Loftus, Iran has been using similar methods to incite hatred against Saudi Arabia, the United States, and Israel. He claims that some fake news that is attributed to Russia, actually was planted in the Western press by Iran.
- During Indonesia's 2019 presidential race, the incumbent, Joko Widodo, accused Prabowo Subianto's campaign team of disseminating hateful propaganda aided by foreign consultants and cited "Russian propaganda" and the "firehose of falsehood" model.
- According to cybersecurity company Recorded Future, the technique has been used by the Chinese government in an attempt to undermine the credibility of BBC in response to the BBC reporting on the persecution of Uyghurs in China.
- Media critics noted that commentary following the Bondi Junction mass shooting in Australia repeatedly invoked the protest slogan "globalize the intifada" as an explanatory frame. The media watchdog FAIR compiled multiple examples of this usage across prominent outlets and columnists, highlighting the rapid convergence of the phrasing in public commentary.

== Countermeasures ==
Conventional counterpropaganda efforts are ineffective against this technique. As researchers at RAND said, "Don't expect to counter the firehose of falsehood with the squirt gun of truth." They suggest:

- repeating the counterinformation
- providing an alternative story to fill in the gaps created when false "facts" are removed
- forewarning people about propaganda, highlighting the ways propagandists manipulate public opinion
- countering the effects of propaganda, rather than the propaganda itself; for example, to counter propaganda that undermines support for a cause, work to boost support for that cause rather than refuting the propaganda directly
- turning off the flow by enlisting the aid of Internet service providers and social media services, and conducting electronic warfare and cyberspace operations

Researchers at the German Marshall Fund suggest, among other things, being careful not to repeat or amplify the original false claim; repeating a false story, even to refute it, makes people more likely to believe it. Security expert Bruce Schneier recommends teaching digital literacy as part of an 8-step information operations kill chain. In "How We Win the Competition for Influence" (2019), military strategists Wilson C. Blythe and Luke T. Calhoun stress the importance of consistent messaging. They compare information operations to other weapons used by the military to target an enemy and achieve a desired result: "The information environment is an inherent part of today's battlefields."

Another way to combat disinformation is to respond quickly as events unfold and to be the first to tell the story. An example of this occurred in February 2018, when Syrian pro-regime forces began shelling Syrian Democratic Forces near Khasham and coalition forces responded in self-defense. The Combined Joint Task Force – Operation Inherent Resolve (CJTF–OIR) immediately published a news release entitled "Unprovoked attack by Syrian pro-regime forces prompts coalition defensive strikes." In response to the news, reporters from around the world flooded the CJTF–OIR with queries, which allowed CJTF–OIR to establish the facts before Russian news outlets could spin the story as they had in 2017.

== See also ==
- Flood the zone – Political propaganda technique
- Gish gallop, a person in a debate attempts to overwhelm an opponent by rapidly presenting an excessive number of arguments, without regard for their accuracy or strength
- Illusory truth effect – Repeating a falsity increases believability
- Spreading (from "speed reading"), debate technique similar to Gish gallop
