= Fluency heuristic =

Mental heuristic

In psychology, a fluency heuristic is a mental heuristic and cognitive bias in which, if one object is processed more fluently, faster, or more smoothly than another, the mind infers that this object has the higher value with respect to the question being considered. In other words, the more skillfully or elegantly an idea is communicated, the more likely it is to be considered seriously, whether or not it is logical.

== Research ==
Jacoby and Dallas (1981) found that if an object "jumps out" at a person and is readily perceived, then they have likely seen it before even if they do not consciously remember seeing it.

As a proxy for real-world quantities:

Hertwig et al. (2008) investigated whether retrieval fluency, like recognition, is a proxy for real-world quantities across five different reference classes in which they expected retrieval fluency to be effective.

a) cities in the U.S with more than 100,000 inhabitants

b) the 100 German companies with the highest revenue in 2003

c) the top 106 music artists in the U.S. in terms of cumulative sales of recordings from 1958 to 2003

d) the highest paid athletes of 2004

e) the 100 wealthiest people in the world

Hertwig et al. measured response time latencies for participants presented with each object. The names of objects were presented in random order and participants were asked if they recognized each object. Hertwig et al. found that differences in recognition latencies are indicative of criteria across five different environments. The strength of the relationship varied across environments. Environments with low ecological validity such as the companies and music artists environments yielded low levels of fluency across five environments. The resulting data provides evidence for the idea that we can at least theoretically infer distal properties of the world.

Are people able to exploit retrieval fluency?

To exploit retrieval fluency, people need to be able to judge accurately whether recognizing object a's name takes longer than recognizing object b's name, or vice versa. Hertwig et al. investigated the extent to which people can accurately tell such differences apart. They observed three results: First, people prove to be quite good at discriminating between recognition latencies whose differences exceeds 100 ms. Second, even when taking less-than perfectly accurate discriminations into account, subjective fluency judgments are a moderately good predictor of the criterion, except in environments in which ecological validity of fluency information is too low to begin with (e.g. music artist's environment). Last, they found that people's ability to discriminate is highest for those pairs in which the validity of fluency peaks.

Are people's inferences in line with the fluency heuristic?

In about two thirds to three fourths of inferences in which the fluency heuristic was applicable, people's actual choices conformed to those predicted by the heuristic. Hertwig et al. also found that the larger the difference between recognition latencies (for two objects), the greater the likelihood that the actual inference adheres to that predicted by the fluency heuristic.

Neural correlates of the fluency heuristic:

Volz, Schooler, and von Cramon (2010) used functional magnetic resonance imaging to isolate fluency-heuristic-based judgments to map the use of fluency onto specific brain areas that might give a better understanding of the heuristic's underlying processes. They determined that there was activation within the claustrum for fluency heuristic decisions. Given that claustrum activation is thought to reflect the integration of perceptual and memory elements into a conscious gestalt, they suggest that activation correlates with the experience of fluency.

The effect of repetition:

Lloyd, Westerman, and Miller (2003) used five experiments to investigate whether the attribution of processing fluency to recognition memory depends on the amount of fluency that is expected from targets based on the frequency with which they appeared during an earlier study phase. Subjects studied targets either one or five times and then were given a recognition test that included a priming phase to enhance the fluency of half of the test items. Results showed that the priming phase had a greater influence on recognition responses when targets had been presented once than when they had been presented five times. However, an interaction between fluency and target frequency was found only when frequency was manipulated between-subjects. An interaction between the priming manipulation and target frequency was also found using a "counterfeit" manipulation of frequency, suggesting that attributions of fluency are adjusted according to subjects' expectations for the amount of fluency that should result from previous experiences with a stimulus.

== See also ==
- Processing fluency
