= Glossary of mathematical jargon =

The language of mathematics has a wide vocabulary of specialist and technical terms. It also has a certain amount of jargon: commonly used phrases which are part of the culture of mathematics, rather than of the subject. Jargon often appears in lectures, and sometimes in print, as informal shorthand for rigorous arguments or precise ideas. Much of this uses common English words, but with a specific non-obvious meaning when used in a mathematical sense.

Some phrases, like "in general", appear below in more than one section.

== Philosophy of mathematics ==
abstract nonsense
A tongue-in-cheek reference to category theory, using which one can employ arguments that establish a (possibly concrete) result without reference to any specifics of the present problem. For that reason, it is also known as general abstract nonsense or generalized abstract nonsense.

[The paper of Eilenberg and Mac Lane (1942)] introduced the very abstract idea of a 'category' — a subject then called 'general abstract nonsense'!

— Saunders Mac Lane (1997)

[Grothendieck] raised algebraic geometry to a new level of abstraction...if certain mathematicians could console themselves for a time with the hope that all these complicated structures were 'abstract nonsense'...the later papers of Grothendieck and others showed that classical problems...which had resisted efforts of several generations of talented mathematicians, could be solved in terms of...complicated concepts.

— Michael Monastyrsky (2001)

canonical
A reference to a standard or choice-free presentation of some mathematical object (e.g., canonical map, canonical form, or canonical ordering). The same term can also be used more informally to refer to something "standard" or "classic". For example, one might say that Euclid's proof is the "canonical proof" of the infinitude of primes.

There are two canonical proofs that are always used to show non-mathematicians what a mathematical proof is like:

- —The proof that there are infinitely many prime numbers.
- —The proof of the irrationality of the square root of two.

— Freek Wiedijk (2006, p.2)

deep
A result is called "deep" if its proof requires concepts and methods that are advanced beyond the concepts needed to formulate the result. For example, the prime number theorem – originally proved using techniques of complex analysis – was once thought to be a deep result until elementary proofs were found. On the other hand, the fact that π is irrational is usually known to be a deep result, because it requires a considerable development of real analysis before the proof can be established – even though the claim itself can be stated in terms of simple number theory and geometry.
elegant
An aesthetic term referring to the ability of an idea to provide insight into mathematics, whether by unifying disparate fields, introducing a new perspective on a single field, or by providing a technique of proof which is either particularly simple, or which captures the intuition or imagination as to why the result it proves is true. In some occasions, the term "beautiful" can also be used to the same effect, though Gian-Carlo Rota distinguished between elegance of presentation and beauty of concept, saying that for example, some topics could be written about elegantly although the mathematical content is not beautiful, and some theorems or proofs are beautiful but may be written about inelegantly.

The beauty of a mathematical theory is independent of the aesthetic qualities...of the theory's rigorous expositions. Some beautiful theories may never be given a presentation which matches their beauty....Instances can also be found of mediocre theories of questionable beauty which are given brilliant, exciting expositions....[Category theory] is rich in beautiful and insightful definitions and poor in elegant proofs....[The theorems] remain clumsy and dull....[Expositions of projective geometry] vied for one another in elegance of presentation and in cleverness of proof....In retrospect, one wonders what all the fuss was about.

Mathematicians may say that a theorem is beautiful when they really mean to say that it is enlightening. We acknowledge a theorem's beauty when we see how the theorem 'fits' in its place....We say that a proof is beautiful when such a proof finally gives away the secret of the theorem....

— Gian-Carlo Rota (1977, pp.173–174, pp.181–182)

elementary
A proof or a result is called "elementary" if it only involves basic concepts and methods in the field, and is to be contrasted with deep results which require more development within or outside the field. The concept of "elementary proof" is used specifically in number theory, where it usually refers to a proof that does not resort to methods from complex analysis.
folklore
A result is called "folklore" if it is non-obvious and non-published, yet generally known to the specialists within a field. In many scenarios, it is unclear as to who first obtained the result, though if the result is significant, it may eventually find its way into the textbooks, whereupon it ceases to be folklore.

Many of the results mentioned in this paper should be considered "folklore" in that they merely formally state ideas that are well-known to researchers in the area, but may not be obvious to beginners and to the best of my knowledge do not appear elsewhere in print.

— Russell Impagliazzo (1995)

natural
Similar to "canonical" but more specific, and which makes reference to a description (almost exclusively in the context of transformations) which holds independently of any choices. Though long used informally, this term has found a formal definition in category theory.
pathological
An object behaves pathologically (or, somewhat more broadly used, in a degenerated way) if it either fails to conform to the generic behavior of such objects, fails to satisfy certain context-dependent regularity properties, or simply disobeys mathematical intuition. These can be contradictory requirements, and sometimes the term is more deliberately used to refer to an object artificially constructed as a counterexample to these properties. A simple example is that from the definition of a triangle having angles which sum to π radians, a single straight line conforms to this definition pathologically.

Since half a century we have seen arise a crowd of bizarre functions which seem to try to resemble as little as possible the honest functions which serve some purpose....Nay more, from the logical point of view, it is these strange functions which are the most general....to-day they are invented expressly to put at fault the reasonings of our fathers....

— Henri Poincaré (1913)

[The Dirichlet function] took on an enormous importance...as giving an incentive for the creation of new types of function whose properties departed completely from what intuitively seemed admissible. A celebrated example of such a so-called 'pathological' function...is the one provided by Weierstrass....This function is continuous but not differentiable.

— J. Sousa Pinto (2004)

Note for that latter quote that as the differentiable functions are meagre in the space of continuous functions, as Banach found out in 1931, differentiable functions are colloquially speaking a rare exception among the continuous ones. Thus it can hardly be defended any-more to call non-differentiable continuous functions pathological.
rigor (rigour)
The act of establishing a mathematical result using indisputable logic, rather than informal descriptive argument. Rigor is a cornerstone quality of mathematics, and can play an important role in preventing mathematics from degenerating into fallacies.
well-behaved
An object is well-behaved (in contrast with being Pathological) if it satisfies certain prevailing regularity properties, or if it conforms to mathematical intuition (even though intuition can often suggest opposite behaviors as well). In some occasions (e.g., analysis), the term "smooth" can also be used to the same effect.

== Descriptive informalities ==
Although ultimately every mathematical argument must meet a high standard of precision, mathematicians use descriptive but informal statements to discuss recurring themes or concepts with unwieldy formal statements. Note that many of the terms are completely rigorous in context.

almost all
A shorthand term for "all except for a set of measure zero", when there is a measure to speak of, with the phrases almost surely and almost everywhere having related meanings. For example, "almost all real numbers are transcendental" because the algebraic real numbers form a countable subset of the real numbers with measure zero. One can also speak of "almost all" integers having a property to mean "all except finitely many", despite the integers not admitting a measure for which this agrees with the previous usage, such as "almost all prime numbers are odd". There is a more complicated meaning for integers as well, discussed in the main article. Finally, this term is sometimes used synonymously with generic, below.
arbitrarily large
Notions which arise mostly in the context of limits, referring to the recurrence of a phenomenon as the limit is approached. A statement such as that predicate P is satisfied by arbitrarily large values, can be expressed in more formal notation by ∀x : ∃y ≥ x : P(y). See also frequently. The statement that quantity f(x) depending on x "can be made" arbitrarily large, corresponds to ∀y : ∃x : f(x) ≥ y.
arbitrary
A shorthand for the universal quantifier. An arbitrary choice is one which is made unrestrictedly, or alternatively, a statement holds of an arbitrary element of a set if it holds of any element of that set. Also much in general-language use among mathematicians: "Of course, this problem can be arbitrarily complicated".
eventually
In the context of limits, this is shorthand meaning for sufficiently large arguments; the relevant argument(s) are implicit in the context. As an example, "the function log(log(x)) eventually becomes larger than 100"; in this context, "eventually" means "for sufficiently large x."
factor through
A term in category theory referring to composition of morphisms. If for three objects A, B, and C a map $f \colon A \to C$ can be written as a composition $f = h \circ g$ with $g \colon A \to B$ and $h \colon B \to C$, then f is said to factor through any (and all) of $B$, $g$, and $h$.
finite
When said of the value of a variable assuming values from the non-negative extended reals $\R_{\geq 0}\cup\{\infty\},$ the meaning is usually "not infinite". For example, if the variance of a random variable is said to be finite, this implies it is a non-negative real number, possibly zero. In some contexts though, for example in "a small but finite amplitude", zero and infinitesimals are meant to be excluded. When said of the value of a variable assuming values from the extended natural numbers $\N\cup\{\infty\},$ the meaning is simply "not infinite". When said of a set or a mathematical object whose main component is a set, it means that the cardinality of the set is less than $\aleph_0$.
frequently
In the context of limits, this is shorthand for arbitrarily large arguments and its relatives; as with eventually, the intended variant is implicit. As an example, the sequence $(-1)^n$ is frequently in the interval (1/2, 3/2), because there are arbitrarily large n for which the value of the sequence is in the interval.
formal, formally
Qualifies anything that is sufficiently precise to be translated straightforwardly in a formal system. For example. a formal proof, a formal definition.
generic
This term has similar connotations as almost all but is used particularly for concepts outside the purview of measure theory. A property holds "generically" on a set if the set satisfies some (context-dependent) notion of density, or perhaps if its complement satisfies some (context-dependent) notion of smallness. For example, a property which holds on a dense G_{δ} (intersection of countably many open sets) is said to hold generically. In algebraic geometry, one says that a property of points on an algebraic variety that holds on a dense Zariski open set is true generically; however, it is usually not said that a property which holds merely on a dense set (which is not Zariski open) is generic in this situation.
in general
In a descriptive context, this phrase introduces a simple characterization of a broad class of objects, with an eye towards identifying a unifying principle. This term introduces an "elegant" description which holds for "arbitrary" objects. Exceptions to this description may be mentioned explicitly, as "pathological" cases.

Norbert A'Campo of the University of Basel once asked Grothendieck about something related to the Platonic solids. Grothendieck advised caution. The Platonic solids are so beautiful and so exceptional, he said, that one cannot assume such exceptional beauty will hold in more general situations.

— Allyn Jackson (2004, p.1197)

left-hand side, right-hand side (LHS, RHS)
Most often, these refer simply to the left-hand or the right-hand side of an equation; for example, $x = y + 1$ has $x$ on the LHS and $y + 1$ on the RHS. Occasionally, these are used in the sense of lvalue and rvalue: an RHS is primitive, and an LHS is derivative.
nice
A mathematical object is colloquially called nice or sufficiently nice if it satisfies hypotheses or properties, sometimes unspecified or even unknown, that are especially desirable in a given context. It is an informal antonym for pathological. For example, one might conjecture that a differential operator ought to satisfy a certain boundedness condition "for nice test functions," or one might state that some interesting topological invariant should be computable "for nice spaces X."
object
Anything that can be assigned to a variable and for which equality with another object can be considered. The term was coined when variables began to be used for sets and mathematical structures.
onto
A function (which in mathematics is generally defined as mapping the elements of one set A to elements of another B) is called "A onto B" (instead of "A to B" or "A into B") only if it is surjective; it may even be said that "f is onto" (i. e. surjective). Not translatable (without circumlocutions) to some languages other than English.
proper
If, for some notion of substructure, objects are substructures of themselves (that is, the relationship is reflexive), then the qualification proper requires the objects to be different. For example, a proper subset of a set S is a subset of S that is different from S, and a proper divisor of a number n is a divisor of n that is different from n. This overloaded word is also non-jargon for a proper morphism.
property
A characteristic that a mathematical object may have or not; for example "being positive". Properties are often expressed with formulas and are used for specifying sets and subsets, typically with set-builder notation.
regular
A function is called regular if it satisfies satisfactory continuity and differentiability properties, which are often context-dependent. These properties might include possessing a specified number of derivatives, with the function and its derivatives exhibiting some nice property (see nice above), such as Hölder continuity. Informally, this term is sometimes used synonymously with smooth, below. These imprecise uses of the word regular are not to be confused with the notion of a regular topological space, which is rigorously defined.
resp.
(Respectively) A convention to shorten parallel expositions. "A (resp. B) [has some relationship to] X (resp. Y)" means that A [has some relationship to] X and also that B [has (the same) relationship to] Y. For example, squares (resp. triangles) have 4 sides (resp. 3 sides); or compact (resp. Lindelöf) spaces are ones where every open cover has a finite (resp. countable) open subcover.
sharp
Often, a mathematical theorem will establish constraints on the behavior of some object; for example, a function will be shown to have an upper or lower bound. The constraint is sharp (sometimes optimal) if it cannot be made more restrictive without failing in some cases. For example, for arbitrary non-negative real numbers x, the exponential function e^{x}, where e = 2.7182818..., gives an upper bound on the values of the quadratic function x^{2}. This is not sharp; the gap between the functions is everywhere at least 1. Among the exponential functions of the form α^{x}, setting α = e^{2/e} = 2.0870652... results in a sharp upper bound; the slightly smaller choice α = 2 fails to produce an upper bound, since then α^{3} = 8 < 3^{2}. In applied fields the word "tight" is often used with the same meaning.
smooth
Smoothness is a concept which mathematics has endowed with many meanings, from simple differentiability to infinite differentiability to analyticity, and still others which are more complicated. Each such usage attempts to invoke the physically intuitive notion of smoothness.
strong, stronger
A theorem is said to be strong if it deduces restrictive results from general hypotheses. One celebrated example is Donaldson's theorem, which puts tight restraints on what would otherwise appear to be a large class of manifolds. This (informal) usage reflects the opinion of the mathematical community: not only should such a theorem be strong in the descriptive sense (below) but it should also be definitive in its area. A theorem, result, or condition is further called stronger than another one if a proof of the second can be easily obtained from the first but not conversely. An example is the sequence of theorems: Fermat's little theorem, Euler's theorem, Lagrange's theorem, each of which is stronger than the last; another is that a sharp upper bound (see sharp above) is a stronger result than a non-sharp one. Finally, the adjective strong or the adverb strongly may be added to a mathematical notion to indicate a related stronger notion; for example, a strong antichain is an antichain satisfying certain additional conditions, and likewise a strongly regular graph is a regular graph meeting stronger conditions. When used in this way, the stronger notion (such as "strong antichain") is a technical term with a precisely defined meaning; the nature of the extra conditions cannot be derived from the definition of the weaker notion (such as "antichain").
sufficiently large, suitably small, sufficiently close
In the context of limits, these terms refer to some (unspecified, even unknown) point at which a phenomenon prevails as the limit is approached. A statement such as that predicate P holds for sufficiently large values, can be expressed in more formal notation by ∃x : ∀y ≥ x : P(y). See also eventually.
upstairs, downstairs
A descriptive term referring to notation in which two objects are written one above the other; the upper one is upstairs and the lower, downstairs. For example, in a fiber bundle, the total space is often said to be upstairs, with the base space downstairs. In a fraction, the numerator is occasionally referred to as upstairs and the denominator downstairs, as in "bringing a term upstairs".
up to, modulo, mod out by
An extension to mathematical discourse of the notions of modular arithmetic. A statement is true up to a condition if the establishment of that condition is the only impediment to the truth of the statement. Also used when working with members of equivalence classes, especially in category theory, where the equivalence relation is (categorical) isomorphism; for example, "The tensor product in a weak monoidal category is associative and unital up to a natural isomorphism."
vanish
To assume the value 0. For example, "The function sin(x) vanishes for those values of x that are integer multiples of π." This can also apply to limits: see Vanish at infinity.
weak, weaker
The converse of strong.
well-defined
Accurately and precisely described or specified. For example, sometimes a definition relies on a choice of some object; the result of the definition must then be independent of this choice.

== Proof terminology ==
The formal language of proof draws repeatedly from a small pool of ideas, many of which are invoked through various lexical shorthands in practice.

aliter
An obsolescent term which is used to announce to the reader an alternative method, or proof of a result. In a proof, it therefore flags a piece of reasoning that is superfluous from a logical point of view, but has some other interest.
by way of contradiction (BWOC), or "for, if not, ..."
The rhetorical prelude to a proof by contradiction, preceding the negation of the statement to be proved.
if and only if (iff)
An abbreviation for logical equivalence of statements.
in general
In the context of proofs, this phrase is often seen in induction arguments when passing from the base case to the induction step, and similarly, in the definition of sequences whose first few terms are exhibited as examples of the formula giving every term of the sequence.
necessary and sufficient
A minor variant on "if and only if"; "A is necessary (and sufficient) for B" means "A if (only if) B". For example, "For a field K to be algebraically closed it is necessary and sufficient that it have no finite field extensions" means "K is algebraically closed if and only if it has no finite extensions". Often used in lists, as in "The following conditions are necessary and sufficient for a field to be algebraically closed...".
need to show (NTS), required to prove (RTP), wish to show, want to show (WTS)
Proofs sometimes proceed by enumerating several conditions whose satisfaction will together imply the desired theorem; thus, one needs to show just these statements.
one and only one
A statement of the existence and uniqueness of an object; the object exists, and furthermore, no other such object exists.
Q.E.D.
(Quod erat demonstrandum): A Latin abbreviation, meaning "which was to be demonstrated", historically placed at the end of proofs, but less common currently, having been supplanted by the Halmos end-of-proof mark, a square sign ∎.
sufficiently nice
A condition on objects in the scope of the discussion, to be specified later, that will guarantee that some stated property holds for them. When working out a theorem, the use of this expression in the statement of the theorem indicates that the conditions involved may be not yet known to the speaker, and that the intent is to collect the conditions that will be found to be needed in order for the proof of the theorem to go through.
the following are equivalent (TFAE)
Often several equivalent conditions (especially for a definition, such as normal subgroup) are equally useful in practice; one introduces a theorem stating an equivalence of more than two statements with TFAE.
transport of structure
It is often the case that two objects are shown to be equivalent in some way, and that one of them is endowed with additional structure. Using the equivalence, we may define such a structure on the second object as well, via transport of structure. For example, any two vector spaces of the same dimension are isomorphic; if one of them is given an inner product and if we fix a particular isomorphism, then we may define an inner product on the other space by factoring through the isomorphism.

Let V be a finite-dimensional vector space over k....Let (e_{i})_{1≤ i ≤ n} be a basis for V....There is an isomorphism of the polynomial algebra k[T_{ij}]_{1≤ i, j ≤ n} onto the algebra Sym_{k}(V ⊗ V^{*})....It extends to an isomorphism of k[GL_{n}] to the localized algebra Sym_{k}(V ⊗ V^{*})_{D}, where D = det(e_{i} ⊗ e_{j}^{*})....We write k[GL(V)] for this last algebra. By transport of structure, we obtain a linear algebraic group GL(V) isomorphic to GL_{n}.

— Igor Shafarevich (1991, p.12)

without (any) loss of generality (WLOG, WOLOG, WALOG), we may assume (WMA)
Sometimes a proposition can be more easily proved with additional assumptions on the objects it concerns. If the proposition as stated follows from this modified one with a simple and minimal explanation (for example, if the remaining special cases are identical but for notation), then the modified assumptions are introduced with this phrase and the altered proposition is proved.

== Proof techniques ==
Mathematicians have several phrases to describe proofs or proof techniques. These are often used as hints for filling in tedious details.

angle chasing
Used to describe a geometrical proof that involves finding relationships between the various angles in a diagram.
back-of-the-envelope calculation
An informal computation omitting much rigor without sacrificing correctness. Often this computation is "proof of concept" and treats only an accessible special case.
brute force
Rather than finding underlying principles or patterns, this is a method where one would evaluate as many cases as needed to sufficiently prove or provide convincing evidence that the thing in question is true. Sometimes this involves evaluating every possible case (where it is also known as proof by exhaustion).
by example
A proof by example is an argument whereby a statement is not proved but instead illustrated by an example. If done well, the specific example would easily generalize to a general proof.
by inspection
A rhetorical shortcut made by authors who invite the reader to verify, at a glance, the correctness of a proposed expression or deduction. If an expression can be evaluated by straightforward application of simple techniques and without recourse to extended calculation or general theory, then it can be evaluated by inspection. It is also applied to solving equations; for example to find roots of a quadratic equation by inspection is to 'notice' them, or mentally check them. 'By inspection' can play a kind of gestalt role: the answer or solution simply clicks into place.
by intimidation
Style of proof where claims believed by the author to be easily verifiable are labelled as 'obvious' or 'trivial', which often results in the reader being confused.
clearly, can be easily shown
A term which shortcuts around calculation the mathematician perceives to be tedious or routine, accessible to any member of the audience with the necessary expertise in the field; Laplace used obvious (French: évident).
complete intuition
commonly reserved for jokes (puns on complete induction).
diagram chasing
Given a commutative diagram of objects and morphisms between them, if one wishes to prove some property of the morphisms (such as injectivity) which can be stated in terms of elements, then the proof can proceed by tracing the path of elements of various objects around the diagram as successive morphisms are applied to it. That is, one chases elements around the diagram, or does a diagram chase.
handwaving
A non-technique of proof mostly employed in lectures, where formal argument is not strictly necessary. It proceeds by omission of details or even significant ingredients, and is merely a plausibility argument.
in general
In a context not requiring rigor, this phrase often appears as a labor-saving device when the technical details of a complete argument would outweigh the conceptual benefits. The author gives a proof in a simple enough case that the computations are reasonable, and then indicates that "in general" the proof is similar.
index battle
For proofs involving objects with multiple indices which can be solved by going to the bottom (if anyone wishes to take up the effort). Similar to diagram chasing.
morally true
Used to indicate that the speaker believes a statement should be true, given their mathematical experience, even though a proof has not yet been put forward. As a variation, the statement may in fact be false, but instead provide a slogan for or illustration of a correct principle. Hasse's local-global principle is a particularly influential example of this.
obviously
See clearly.
the proof is left as an exercise to the reader
Usually applied to a claim within a larger proof when the proof of that claim can be produced routinely by any member of the audience with the necessary expertise, but is not so simple as to be obvious.
trivial
Similar to clearly. A concept is trivial if it holds by definition, is an immediate corollary to a known statement, or is a simple special case of a more general concept.

== Miscellaneous ==
This section features terms used across different areas in mathematics, or terms that do not typically appear in more specialized glossaries. For the terms used only in some specific areas of mathematics, see glossaries in Category:Glossaries of mathematics.

binary
A binary relation is a set of ordered pairs; an element x is said to be related to another element y if and only if (x,y) are in the set.

correspondence
A correspondence from a set A to a set B is a subset of a Cartesian product A × B ; in other words, it is a binary relation but with the specification of the ambient sets A, B used in the definition.

diagram
A visual representation of the relationship(s) between variables.

function
A function f: A → B is an ordered triple (A, B, f ) consisting of sets A, B and a subset f of the Cartesian product A × B subject to the condition (a, b), (a, b′) ∈ f implies b = b′. In other words, it is a special kind of correspondence where given an element a of A, there is a unique element b of B that corresponds to it.
fundamental
The word fundamental is used to describe a theorem with a given area of mathematics considered to be the most central theorem of that particular area (e.g. Fundamental Theorem of Arithmetic for Arithmetic).

invariant
An invariant of an object or a space is a property or number of the object or a space that remains unchanged under some transformations.

map
A synonym for a function between sets or a morphism in a category. Depending on authors, the term "maps" or the term "functions" may be reserved for specific kinds of functions or morphisms (e.g., function as an analytic term and map as a general term).
mathematics
See mathematics.
multivalued
A "multivalued function" from a set A to a set B is a function from A to the subsets of B. It has typically the property that, for almost all points x of B, there is a neighbourhood of x such that the restriction of the function to the neighbourhood can be considered as a set of functions from the neighbourhood to B.

projection
A projection is, roughly, a map from some space or object to another that omits some information on the object or space. For example, $\mathbb{R}^2 \to \mathbb{R}, (x, y) \mapsto x$ is a projection and its restriction to a graph of a function, say, is also a projection. The terms "idempotent operator" and "forgetful map" are also synonyms for a projection.

structure
A mathematical structure on an object is an additional set of objects or data attached to the object (e.g., relation, operation, metric, topology).

== See also ==
- Glossary of areas of mathematics
- List of mathematical constants
- List of mathematical symbols
- Category:Mathematical terminology

== Bibliography ==
- Encyclopedia of Mathematics
