= Transport of structure =

Property of structural isomorphism

In mathematics, particularly in universal algebra and category theory, transport of structure refers to the process whereby a mathematical object acquires a new structure and its canonical definitions, as a result of being isomorphic to (or otherwise identified with) another object with a pre-existing structure. Definitions by transport of structure are regarded as canonical.

== Examples ==
Since mathematical structures are often defined in reference to an underlying space, many examples of transport of structure involve spaces and mappings between them. For example, if $V$ and $W$ are vector spaces with $(\cdot,\cdot)$ being an inner product on $W$, such that there is an isomorphism $\phi$ from $V$ to $W$, then one can define an inner product $[\cdot, \cdot]$ on $V$ by the following rule:

$$[v_1, v_2] = (\phi(v_1), \phi(v_2))$$

Although the equation makes sense even when $\phi$ is not an isomorphism, it only defines an inner product on $V$ when $\phi$ is, since otherwise it will cause $[\cdot,\cdot]$ to be degenerate. The idea is that $\phi$ allows one to consider $V$ and $W$ as "the same" vector space, and by following this analogy, then one can transport an inner product from one space to the other.

A more elaborated example comes from differential topology, in which the notion of smooth manifold is involved: if $M$ is such a manifold, and if $X$ is any topological space which is homeomorphic to $M$, then one can consider $X$ as a smooth manifold as well. That is, given a homeomorphism $\phi \colon X \to M$, one can define coordinate charts on $X$ by "pulling back" coordinate charts on $M$ through $\phi$. Recall that a coordinate chart on $M$ is an open set $U$ together with an injective map

$$c \colon U \to \mathbb{R}^n$$

for some natural number $n$; to get such a chart on $X$, one uses the following rules:

$U' = \phi^{-1}(U)$ and $c' = c \circ \phi$.

Furthermore, it is required that the charts cover $M$ (the fact that the transported charts cover $X$ follows immediately from the fact that $\phi$ is a bijection). Since $M$ is a smooth manifold, if U and V, with their maps $c \colon U \to \mathbb{R}^n$ and $d \colon V \to \mathbb{R}^n$, are two charts on $M$, then the composition, the "transition map"

$d \circ c^{-1} \colon c(U \cap V) \to \mathbb{R}^n$ (a self-map of $\mathbb{R}^n$)

is smooth. To verify this for the transported charts on $X$, notice that

$$\phi^{-1}(U) \cap \phi^{-1}(V) = \phi^{-1}(U \cap V)$$,

and therefore

$c'(U' \cap V') = (c \circ \phi)(\phi^{-1}(U \cap V)) = c(U \cap V)$, and
$$d' \circ (c')^{-1} = (d \circ \phi) \circ (c \circ \phi)^{-1} = d \circ (\phi \circ \phi^{-1}) \circ c^{-1} = d \circ c^{-1}$$.

Thus the transition map for $U'$ and $V'$ is the same as that for $U$ and $V$, hence smooth. That is, $X$ is a smooth manifold via transport of structure. This is a special case of transport of structures in general.

The second example also illustrates why "transport of structure" is not always desirable. Namely, one can take $M$ to be the plane, and $X$ to be an infinite one-sided cone. By "flattening" the cone, a homeomorphism of $X$ and $M$ can be obtained, and therefore the structure of a smooth manifold on $X$, but the cone is not "naturally" a smooth manifold. That is, one can consider $X$ as a subspace of 3-space, in which context it is not smooth at the cone point.

A more surprising example is that of exotic spheres, discovered by John Milnor, which states that there are exactly 28 smooth manifolds which are homeomorphic but not diffeomorphic to $S^7$, the 7-dimensional sphere in 8-space. Thus, transport of structure is most productive when there exists a canonical isomorphism between the two objects.

== See also ==
- List of mathematical jargon
- Equivalent definitions of mathematical structures#Transport of structures; isomorphism
