= Estimation (disambiguation) =

Estimation is the process of finding a usable approximation of a result.

Estimation may also refer to:

- Estimation theory, a field in statistics, also used in signal processing
- Estimation statistics, a data analysis approach in frequentist statistics
- Estimation (project management)
- Approximation, finding estimates in the form of upper or lower bounds for a quantity that cannot readily be evaluated precisely
- Forecasting
- Prediction

== See also ==
- Guesstimate, an informal estimate when little information is available
