= Intragroup conflict =

Conflict between members of a group or team

In: sociology, group dynamics, intragroup conflict refers to conflict, confrontation, disagreement between two or more members of the same group or team the consequence or result of which could be either positive (beneficial) or negative. Examples include arguments between members of the same family, department, or team. The term infighting has a similar usage of inner-group disagreement but with the combatative connotation, fighting, (Note: The current word definition including: Fighting or boxing at close range, originated in Old English as an attack within a dwelling.) the dynamics of which are termed agonistic behaviour. (Note: The term originating in the ancient Greek ἀγών (agon))Usage of the term internecine fighting as intragroup includes war. (Note: from internecinus (which is Latin) from Cic. Phil. 14 M. Tullius Cicero: M. ANTONIVM ORATIO PHILIPPICA QVARTA DECIMA: gratae vero nostrae dis immortalibus gratulationes erunt, gratae victimae, cum interfecta sit civium multitudo! 'de improbis' inquit 'et audacibus.' nam sic eos appellat clarissimus vir: quae sunt urbanarum maledicta litium, non inustae belli internecini notae. testamenta, credo, subiciunt aut eiciunt vicinos aut adulescentulos circumscribunt: his enim vitiis adfectos et talibus malos aut audacis appellare consuetudo solet.)

== Subject development ==
=== Ancient ===
==== Eristic ====
The term eristic, which is thought to originate with Plato, describes a dispute or quarrel. (Note: In the modern sense this type of argument could include specious reasoning)

==== Stasis ====
The Politics of Aristotle (of Stagira) uses the Attic Greek term stasis (ΣΤΑΣΙΣ), a political conflict, translated by some modern authors as civil war (which though is an analog) occurring within city-states of ancient Greece. (Note: In Argos members of a democratic group killed both the leaders of their own group and members of a differing political group. The Aristotle description of stasis includes "within like-minded groups". (Skultety 2019))

=== Modern ===
In the years leading up to 2008, intragroup conflict has received a large amount of attention in conflict and group dynamics literature. This increase in interest in studying intragroup conflict may be a natural corollary of the ubiquitous use of work groups and work teams across all levels of organizations, including decision-making task forces, project groups, or production teams.

== Antecedents ==
There are a number of antecedents of intragroup conflict. While not an exhaustive list, researchers have identified a number of antecedents of intragroup conflict, including low task or goal uncertainty, increased group size, increased diversity (i.e., gender, age, race), lack of information sharing, and high task interdependence.

== Types ==
The American Psychological Association determines the existence of three such intra-conflictual problems in team organisations: process, relationship, task.

== Measuring ==
Jehn developed the Intragroup Conflict Scale (ICS) to measure two types of intragroup conflicts (i.e., task and relationship conflict). The ICS consists of eight 7-point Likert scale items which assess intragroup conflict. This scale has been applied in a number of contexts including decision making groups and groups in the moving industry. Furthermore, this scale has high construct and predictive validity.

== Group outcomes ==
Effects of intragroup conflict on group performance or outcome is moderated by a number of factors including the context under which it is examined and the type of outcome. According to one study, task conflict has a less negative relationship (and at times even positive) with group performance and outcomes than believed previously. The results of the study also showed that intragroup conflict is not always negative or detrimental to group performance; for example, task conflict has been related positively to group performance and outcomes when such conflict occurs in management groups.

== See also ==
- Group conflict
- Lateral violence
- Narcissism of small differences
- Vote-splitting

== Sources ==
Amin Ghaziani; Kelsy Kretschmer (January 4, 2023). "Chapter 12: Infighting and Insurrection - Introduction - The Causal Tradition". In David A. Snow; Hanspeter Kriesi; Holly J. McCammon; Sarah Anne Soule (eds.). The Wiley Blackwell Companion to Social Movements (2nd ed.). John Wiley & Sons, Incorporated. pp. 220, 225. ISBN 9781119168560. "Research on social movements highlights the centrality of conflicts, yet scholars frequently conflate its diverse forms" "The classical tradition of infighting assumed that conflict within movements deserved its sorry reputation; it was a form of internecine dog fighting; and it hastened movement collapse by rendering insurgent groups impotent."
