= Without loss of generality =

Expression in mathematics

In mathematics, without loss of generality (WOLOG, WLOG or w.l.o.g.; less commonly stated as without any loss of generality or with no loss of generality) is used to indicate the assumption that what follows is chosen arbitrarily, narrowing the premise to a particular case, but does not affect the validity of the proof in general. The other cases are sufficiently similar to the one presented that proving them follows by essentially the same logic. As a result, once a proof is given for the particular case, it is trivial to adapt it to prove the conclusion in all other cases.

In many scenarios, the use of "without loss of generality" is made possible by the presence of symmetry. For example, if some property P(x,y) of real numbers is known to be symmetric in x and y, namely that P(x,y) is equivalent to P(y,x), then in proving that P(x,y) holds for every x and y, one may assume "without loss of generality" that x ≤ y. There is no loss of generality in this assumption, since once the case x ≤ y ⇒ P(x,y) has been proved, the other case follows by interchanging x and y: y ≤ x ⇒ P(y,x), and by symmetry of P, this implies P(x,y), thereby showing that P(x,y) holds for all cases.

On the other hand, if neither such a symmetry nor another form of equivalence can be established, then the use of "without loss of generality" is incorrect and can amount to an instance of proof by example – a logical fallacy of proving a claim by proving a non-representative example.

== Example ==
Consider the following theorem (which is a case of the pigeonhole principle):

If three objects are each painted either red or blue, then there must be at least two objects of the same color.

A proof:

Assume, without loss of generality, that the first object is red. If either of the other two objects is red, then we are finished; if not, then the other two objects must both be blue and we are still finished.

The above argument works because the same reasoning could be applied if the alternative assumption, namely, that the first object is blue, were made, or, similarly, that the words 'red' and 'blue' can be freely exchanged in the wording of the proof. As a result, the use of "without loss of generality" is valid in this case.

== See also ==
- Mathematical jargon
- Up to
