= Follow one's nose =

"Follow one's nose" is a metaphoric idiom in English. It may refer to:

- Following one's intuition, especially in an investigation or other research
- More literally, to use one's sense of smell, to locate the source of an odor
  - For an animal with keen smell, such as a scent hound, to do so (e.g. to track prey in the wild; or, in service to humans, for hunters' game tracking, drug detection for police, and search and rescue operations)
- Nose-following, a mathematics publishing and pedagogical term meaning to pursue a mathematical solution by mechanistically applying one's already-understood concepts without learning or applying anything new
