= Space mathematics =

Space mathematics may refer to:

- Orbital mechanics
- Newton's laws of motion
- Newton's law of universal gravitation
- Space (mathematics)
