= QAMA Calculator =

Type of Calculator

The QAMA Calculator is a calculator that requires users to provide a reasonable estimate of the answer before the precise answer is delivered. QAMA stands for Quick Approximate Mental Arithmetic.

Invented by Ilan Samson, it aims to get users to think first by estimating before they get the correct answer. Estimation is seen by many as an essential part of mathematics, and some believe that the presence and popularity of calculators could inhibit the use of estimation skills.

A physical version of the calculator was released for sale in 2014, with apps for smartphones and tablets developed in 2016.
