= Specious reasoning =

Logical fallacy

Specious reasoning is a form of argument or analysis that relies on lies, misdirection, or misinterpreted information to make its point. Assertions made under specious reasoning often appear or are generally accepted to be true and credible. Specious arguments do not rely on a lack of intelligence or knowledge in a given subject, and even published works by authors highly educated in their fields can be seen to be founded on specious reasoning at their core.

Specious reasoning does not necessarily rely on malicious intent, and one could formulate a specious argument with what they see as sound logic, only to produce an idea that is flawed or factually incorrect. It is a general term that encompasses forms of logical fallacy, such as tu quoque and circular reasoning. Specious reasoning often presents a sanitised or beautified view of an issue that can make it appear less of a problem, such as downplaying the effects of climate change, and can be deceptively persuasive.

Deliberately specious reasoning can be seen as a form of sophism.

== Etymology ==
The term comes from the late Middle English word meaning 'beautiful', itself coming from the Latin word 'speciosus' meaning 'fair'. This highlights the common quality of specious assertions being attractive in concept and pleasant to place belief in, thereby making them more readily adopted by the layperson despite a lack of factual basis or sound logical reasoning.

== Examples ==
The Vote Leave campaign surrounding the United Kingdom European Union membership referendum of 2016 relied heavily on arguments that may now retrospectively be labelled as specious reasoning, making promises that were later established to be false or impossible to fulfill. One such promise was that emblazoned on the side of the 'Brexit red bus', which implied that by leaving the EU, the UK would be able to reserve £350 million a week sent to the union and instead direct it into funding the NHS. This was later found to have been misleading.

Specious arguments have historically been used to argue against change that affects culturally accepted and profitable practices; such was the case when certain medical professionals tried to warn of the dangers of smoking tobacco.

A common form of specious arguing, particularly in politics, is that of the Gish gallop, a rhetorical technique which sees the user overwhelm their opponent with a high volume of arguments with no regard for their accuracy, quality, or relevance. The Gish gallop is notorious for being a poor method of debate yet a difficult method to counter and overcome for those faced by it. Gish galloping is also known as proof by verbosity, and audiences can be swayed by the rapid succession of arguments and tricked into believing that the speaker must have evidence on their side.

== See also ==
- Argument from authority
- Authority bias
- Circular reasoning
- Demagogue
- Ipse dixit
- List of cognitive biases
- Sophist
- Systemic bias
