= Scientific wild-ass guess =

Slang for rough estimation

Scientific wild-ass guess (SWAG) is an American English slang term meaning a rough estimate made by an expert in the field, based on experience and intuition. It is similar to the slang word guesstimate, a portmanteau of guess and estimate.

== History ==
The slang term "SWAG" is generally thought to have originated in the US military, either the Army or the Air Force. Journalist Melvin J. Lasky wrote that it was first used casually by US Army General William Westmoreland during the Vietnam War. Westmoreland would sometimes reply "SWAG" to reporters' questions about American failure to neutralize the enemy. Westmoreland's use of the term was affirmed in court by Colonel John Frank Stewart in November 1984 during witness testimony for the lawsuit initiated by Westmoreland against CBS for their TV documentary The Uncounted Enemy: A Vietnam Deception. On the witness stand, Stewart explained that in Vietnam, the military intelligence branch that he commanded would deliver numbers of enemy strength to Westmoreland, the numbers derived from "the SWAG principle". There was laughter in the court when Stewart explained what was meant by the acronym SWAG.

An earlier use of term is mentioned by linguist J. Robert Dumouchel who wrote the 1975 book, Dictionary of Development Terminology. Dumouchel says he first encountered SWAG "in the vernacular of community development" in the US in the 1960s.

Regardless of its origin, the term gained greater prominence in the first half of 1999 in connection with the NATO bombing of Yugoslavia. Reporter John F. Harris of The Washington Post was the first person to put the term into a newspaper article. Describing the factors that led to President Bill Clinton relying on the U.S. Air Force in Kosovo instead of employing "200,000 NATO troops", Harris wrote that NATO's estimate requiring 200,000 ground troops was regarded by American war planners as politically impossible to achieve; it was quickly removed from consideration. "NATO's analysis, officials said, was not a comprehensive study. Instead, it was an initial review that some officials called a 'SWAG'—military parlance for a 'scientific wild-ass guess.'"

== Use ==
SWAG is used to describe an estimate derived from a combination of factors including past experience, general impressions, and heuristic or approximate calculations rather than an exhaustive search, proof, or rigorous calculation. The SWAG is an educated guess but is not regarded as the best or most accurate estimate.

Various other backronyms of SWAG have been published, including "sophisticated wild-ass guess", "Silly Wild-Ass Guess", "Semi-Wild-Ass Guess", "Stupid Wild-Ass Guess", and "Scientific Wildly Aimed Guess". "Scientific" implies that the "guess" can be justified if necessary or cost-effective. A guess of lesser worth may be called the "Wild-Ass Guess" or "WAG". A slightly better estimate may be called "Back of the Envelope" (BOTE).

== See also ==
- Rule of thumb
- SNAFU
- Swaggering
