= Estimation =

Process of finding an approximation

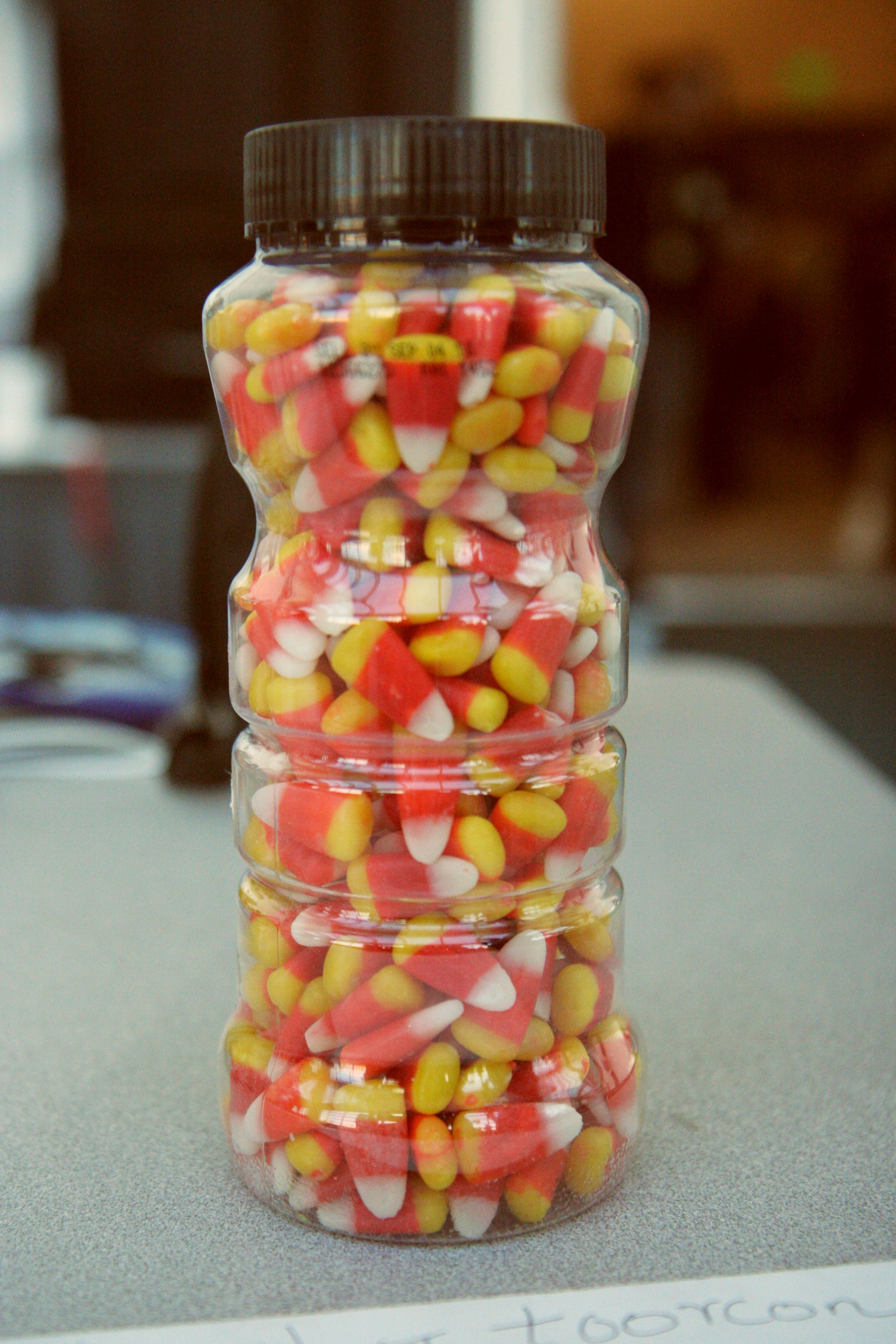
The exact number of candies in this jar cannot be determined by looking at it, because most of the candies are not visible. It can be estimated by assuming that the density of the unseen candies is the same as that of the visible candies.

Estimation (or estimating) is the process of finding an estimate or approximation, which is a value that is usable for some purpose even if input data may be incomplete, uncertain, or unstable. The value is nonetheless usable because it is derived from the best information available. Typically, estimation involves "using the value of a statistic derived from a sample to estimate the value of a corresponding population parameter". The sample provides information that can be projected, through various formal or informal processes, to determine a range most likely to describe the missing information. An estimate that turns out to be incorrect will be an overestimate if the estimate exceeds the actual result and an underestimate if the estimate falls short of the actual result.

The confidence in an estimate is quantified as a confidence interval, the likelihood that the estimate is in a certain range. Human estimators systematically suffer from overconfidence, believing that their estimates are more accurate than they actually are.

== How estimation is done ==
Estimation is often done by sampling, which is counting a small number from a selected subset, and projecting that number onto a larger population. An example of estimation would be determining how many candies of a given size are in a glass jar. Because the distribution of candies inside the jar may vary, the observer can count the number of candies visible through the glass, consider the size of the jar, and presume that a similar distribution can be found in the parts that can not be seen, thereby making an estimate of the total number of candies that could be in the jar if that presumption were true. Estimates can similarly be generated by projecting results from polls or surveys onto the entire population.

In making an estimate, the goal is often most useful to generate a range of possible outcomes that is precise enough to be useful but not so precise that it is likely to be inaccurate. For example, in trying to guess the number of candies in the jar, if fifty were visible, and the total volume of the jar seemed to be about twenty times as large as the volume containing the visible candies, then one might simply project that there were a thousand candies in the jar. Such a projection, intended to pick the single value that is believed to be closest to the actual value, is called a point estimate. However, a point estimation is likely to be incorrect, because the sample size—in this case, the number of candies that are visible—is too small a number to be sure that it does not contain anomalies that differ from the population as a whole. A corresponding concept is an interval estimate, which captures a much larger range of possibilities, but is too broad to be useful. For example, if one were asked to estimate the percentage of people who like candy, it would clearly be correct that the number falls between zero and one hundred percent. Such an estimate would provide no guidance, however, to somebody who is trying to determine how many candies to buy for a party to be attended by a hundred people.

== Uses of estimation ==
In mathematics, approximation describes the process of finding estimates in the form of upper or lower bounds for a quantity that cannot readily be evaluated precisely, and approximation theory deals with finding simpler functions that are close to some complicated function and that can provide useful estimates. In statistics, an estimator is the formal name for the rule by which an estimate is calculated from data, and estimation theory deals with finding estimators with good properties. This process is used in signal processing, for approximating an unobserved signal on the basis of an observed signal containing noise. For estimation of yet-to-be observed quantities, forecasting and prediction are applied. A Fermi problem, in physics, is one concerning estimation in problems that typically involve making justified guesses about quantities that seem impossible to compute given limited available information.

Estimation is important in business and economics because too many variables exist to figure out how large-scale activities will develop. Estimation in project planning can be particularly significant, because plans for the distribution of labor and purchases of raw materials must be made, despite the inability to know every possible problem that may come up. A certain amount of resources will be available for carrying out a particular project, making it important to obtain or generate a cost estimate as one of the vital elements of entering into the project. The U.S. Government Accountability Office defines a cost estimate as, "the summation of individual cost elements, using established methods and valid data, to estimate the future costs of a program, based on what is known today", and reports that "realistic cost estimating was imperative when making wise decisions in acquiring new systems". Furthermore, project plans must neither underestimate the needs of the project, which can result in delays while unmet needs are fulfilled, nor must they greatly overestimate the needs of the project, or else the unneeded resources may go to waste.

An informal estimate when little information is available is called a guesstimate because the inquiry becomes closer to purely guessing the answer. The estimated sign, ℮, is used to designate that package contents are close to the nominal contents.

== See also ==
- Abundance estimation
- Ansatz
- Ballpark estimate
- Back-of-the-envelope calculation
- Conjecture
- Cost estimate
- Estimation statistics
- Estimation theory
- Fermi problem
- German tank problem
- State observer
- Kalman filter
- Intuition
- Mark and recapture
- Moving horizon estimation
- Sales quote
- Upper and lower bounds
