= Gish gallop =

Rapid-fire argument rhetorical technique

The Gish gallop is a rhetorical technique in which a person in a debate attempts to overwhelm an opponent by presenting an excessive number of arguments, without regard for their accuracy or strength, with a rapidity that makes it impossible for the opponent to address them in the time available. Gish galloping prioritizes the quantity of the galloper's arguments at the expense of their quality.

The term "Gish gallop" was coined in 1994 by the anthropologist Eugenie Scott, who named it after the creationist Duane Gish, described by Scott as the technique's "most avid practitioner".

== Strategy ==
During a typical Gish gallop, the galloper confronts an opponent with a rapid series of specious arguments, half-truths, misrepresentations, and outright lies, making it impossible for the opponent to refute all of them within the format of the debate. Each point raised by the Gish galloper takes considerably longer to refute than to assert. The technique wastes an opponent's time and may cast doubt on the opponent's debating ability for an audience unfamiliar with the technique, especially if no independent fact-checking is involved, or if the audience has limited knowledge of the topics.

The difference in effort between making claims and refuting them is known as "Brandolini's law", or informally "the bullshit asymmetry principle". A flood of dubious messages such as a Gish gallop is sometimes called "the firehose of falsehood".

== Countering the Gish gallop ==
Journalist Mehdi Hasan suggests three steps when faced with a Gish gallop:

1. When presented with too many falsehoods to address, pick just one. Choose the weakest, dumbest, most ludicrous argument that the galloper has presented and tear that argument to shreds ("the weak point rebuttal").
2. Do not budge from the issue or move on until having decisively destroyed the nonsense and clearly made the counterpoint.
3. Call out the galloper's strategy by name, saying: "This is a strategy called the 'Gish Gallop'—do not be fooled by the flood of nonsense you have just heard."

Generally, it is more difficult to use the Gish gallop in a structured debate than a free-form one. If a debater is familiar with an opponent who is known to use the Gish gallop, the technique may be countered by pre-empting and refuting the opponent's commonly used arguments before the opponent has an opportunity to launch into the Gish gallop.

== Reverse Gish gallop ==
A related technique is the reverse Gish gallop, where the galloper listens to the opponent's rebuttal; finds an error, approximation, or omission; then attacks that as a way to attack the opponent's credibility. For example, if the correct value is 43 and the opponent says "40" instead of "about 40", then the galloper can use that to suggest the opponent is sloppy and their other arguments are full of errors. Another name suggested for this is weaponized pedantry.

== See also ==
- Ad hominem attack – Attacking the person rather than their argument
- Filibuster – Political stalling tactic
- Flood the zone – Political propaganda technique
- Proof by intimidation – Marking an argument as obvious or trivial
- Sealioning – Type of trolling or harassment
- Spreading – Competitive debate tactic

== General and cited sources ==
- Grant, John (2011). Denying Science: Conspiracy Theories, Media Distortions, and the War Against Reality. Prometheus Books. ISBN 978-1-61614-400-5.
- Grant, John (2015). Debunk it: How to Stay Sane in a World of Misinformation. San Francisco: Zest Books. ISBN 978-1-936976-68-3.
- Hayward, C. J. S. (2015). The Seraphinians: "Blessed Seraphim Rose" and His Axe-Wielding Western Converts. The Collected Works of C.J.S. Hayward. San Francisco: Zest Books. ISBN 9781517068134.
- Johnson, Amy (2017). Gasser, Urs (ed.). "The Multiple Harms of Sea Lions" (PDF). Perspectives on Harmful Speech Online. Berkman Klein Center for Internet & Society. p. 14.
- Logan, Paul (25 February 2000). "Scientists Offer Creationist Defense". West Side Journal. Albuquerque Journal. Vol. 120, no. 56. p. 4 – via Newspapers.com.
- Sonleitner, Frank J. (November–December 2004). "Winning the Creation Debate". Reports. 24 (6). National Center for Science Education: 36–38.
- Scott, Eugenie (2004). Confronting Creationism. Reports of National Center for Science Education. Vol. 24/6. Archived from the original on 12 June 2018.
- Scott, Eugenie (1994). "Debates and the Globetrotters". Talk Origins Archive.
- Hasan, Medhi (2023). "How to Beat Trump in a Debate". The Atlantic.
- Richardson, Heather Cox, June 27, 2024, Letters from an American, June 28, 2024
