= Arbitrarily large =

Mathematical concept

In mathematics, the phrases arbitrarily large, arbitrarily small and arbitrarily long are used in statements to make clear the fact that an object is large, small, or long with little limitation or restraint, respectively. The use of "arbitrarily" often occurs in the context of real numbers (and its subsets thereof), though its meaning can differ from that of "sufficiently" and "infinitely".

== Examples ==
The statement

"$f(x)$ is non-negative for arbitrarily large $x$."

is a shorthand for:

"For every real number $n$, $f(x)$ is non-negative for some value of $x$ greater than $n$."

In the common parlance, the term "arbitrarily long" is often used in the context of sequence of numbers. For example, to say that there are "arbitrarily long arithmetic progressions of prime numbers" does not mean that there exists any infinitely long arithmetic progression of prime numbers (there is not), nor that there exists any particular arithmetic progression of prime numbers that is in some sense "arbitrarily long". Rather, the phrase is used to refer to the fact that no matter how large a number $n$ is, there exists some arithmetic progression of prime numbers of length at least $n$.

Similar to arbitrarily large, one can also define the phrase "$P(x)$ holds for arbitrarily small real numbers", as follows:

$$\forall \epsilon \in \mathbb{R}_{+},\, \exists x \in \mathbb{R} : |x|<\epsilon \land P(x)$$

In other words:

However small a number, there will be a number $x$ smaller than it such that $P(x)$ holds.

== Arbitrarily large vs. sufficiently large vs. infinitely large ==
While similar, "arbitrarily large" is not equivalent to "sufficiently large". For instance, while it is true that prime numbers can be arbitrarily large (since there are infinitely many of them due to Euclid's theorem), it is not true that all sufficiently large numbers are prime.

As another example, the statement "$f(x)$ is non-negative for arbitrarily large $x$." could be rewritten as:

$$\forall n \in \mathbb{R} \mbox{, } \exists x \in \mathbb{R} \mbox{ such that } x > n \land f(x) \ge 0$$

However, using "sufficiently large", the same phrase becomes:

$$\exists n \in \mathbb{R} \mbox{ such that } \forall x \in \mathbb{R} \mbox{, } x > n \Rightarrow f(x) \ge 0$$

Furthermore, "arbitrarily large" also does not mean "infinitely large". For example, although prime numbers can be arbitrarily large, an infinitely large prime number does not exist—since all prime numbers (as well as all other integers) are finite.

In some cases, phrases such as "the proposition $P(x)$ is true for arbitrarily large $x$" are used primarily for emphasis, as in "$P(x)$ is true for all $x$, no matter how large $x$ is." In these cases, the phrase "arbitrarily large" does not have the meaning indicated above (i.e., "however large a number, there will be some larger number for which $P(x)$ still holds."). Instead, the usage in this case is in fact logically synonymous with "all".

== See also ==
- Sufficiently large
- Mathematical jargon
