= Fermi problem =

Estimation problem in physics or engineering

A Fermi problem (or Fermi question, Fermi quiz), also known as an order-of-magnitude problem, is an estimation problem in physics or engineering education, designed to teach dimensional analysis or approximation of extreme scientific calculations. Fermi problems are usually back-of-the-envelope calculations. Fermi problems typically involve making justified guesses about quantities and their variance or lower and upper bounds. In some cases, order-of-magnitude estimates can also be derived using dimensional analysis. A Fermi estimate (or order-of-magnitude estimate, order estimation) is an estimate of an extreme scientific calculation.

== Historical background ==
The estimation technique is named after physicist Enrico Fermi as he was known for his ability to make good approximate calculations with little or no actual data. An example is Enrico Fermi's estimate of the strength of the atomic bomb that detonated at the Trinity test, based on the distance traveled by pieces of paper he dropped from his hand during the blast. Fermi's estimate of 10 kilotons of TNT was well within an order of magnitude of the now-accepted value of 21 kilotons.

== Justification ==
Fermi estimates generally work because the estimations of the individual terms are often close to correct, and overestimates and underestimates help cancel each other out. That is, if there is no consistent bias, a Fermi calculation that involves the multiplication of several estimated factors (such as the number of piano tuners in Chicago) will probably be more accurate than might be first supposed.

In detail, multiplying estimates corresponds to adding their logarithms; thus one obtains a sort of Wiener process or random walk on the logarithmic scale, which diffuses as $\sqrt{n}$ (in number of terms n). In discrete terms, the number of overestimates minus underestimates will have a binomial distribution. In continuous terms, if one makes a Fermi estimate of n steps, with standard deviation σ units on the log scale from the actual value, then the overall estimate will have standard deviation $\sigma\sqrt{n}$, since the standard deviation of a sum scales as $\sqrt{n}$ in the number of summands.

For instance, if one makes a 9-step Fermi estimate, at each step overestimating or underestimating the correct number by a factor of 2 (or with a standard deviation 2), then after 9 steps the standard error will have grown by a logarithmic factor of $\sqrt{9} = 3$, so 2^{3} = 8. Thus one will expect to be within 1/8 to 8 times the correct value – within an order of magnitude, and much less than the worst case of erring by a factor of 2^{9} = 512 (about 2.71 orders of magnitude). If one has a shorter chain or estimates more accurately, the overall estimate will be correspondingly better.

== Examples ==
Fermi questions are often extreme in nature, and cannot usually be solved using common mathematical or scientific information.

Example questions given by the official Fermi Competition:

"If the mass of one teaspoon of water could be converted entirely into energy in the form of heat, what volume of water, initially at room temperature, could it bring to a boil? (litres)."

"How much does the Thames River heat up in going over the Fanshawe Dam? (Celsius degrees)."

"What is the mass of all the automobiles scrapped in North America this month? (kilograms)."

Possibly the most famous order-of-magnitude problem is the Fermi paradox, which considers the odds of a significant number of intelligent civilizations existing in the galaxy, and ponders the apparent contradiction of human civilization never having encountered any. A well-known attempt to ponder this paradox through the lens of a Fermi estimate is the Drake equation, which seeks to estimate the number of such civilizations present in the galaxy.

== Advantages and scope ==
Scientists often look for Fermi estimates of the answer to a problem before turning to more sophisticated methods to calculate a precise answer. This provides a useful check on the results. While the estimate is almost certainly incorrect, it is also a simple calculation that allows for easy error checking, and to find faulty assumptions if the figure produced is far beyond what we might reasonably expect. By contrast, precise calculations can be extremely complex but with the expectation that the answer they produce is correct. The far larger number of factors and operations involved can obscure a very significant error, either in mathematical process or in the assumptions the equation is based on, but the result may still be assumed to be right because it has been derived from a precise formula that is expected to yield good results. Without a reasonable frame of reference to work from it is seldom clear if a result is acceptably precise or is many degrees of magnitude (tens or hundreds of times) too big or too small. The Fermi estimation gives a quick, simple way to obtain this frame of reference for what might reasonably be expected to be the answer.

As long as the initial assumptions in the estimate are reasonable quantities, the result obtained will give an answer within the same scale as the correct result, and if not gives a base for understanding why this is the case. For example, suppose a person was asked to determine the number of piano tuners in Chicago. If their initial estimate told them there should be a hundred or so, but the precise answer tells them there are many thousands, then they know they need to find out why there is this divergence from the expected result. First looking for errors, then for factors the estimation did not take account of – does Chicago have a number of music schools or other places with a disproportionately high ratio of pianos to people? Whether close or very far from the observed results, the context the estimation provides gives useful information both about the process of calculation and the assumptions that have been used to look at problems.

=== Choosing calculation methods ===
Fermi estimates are also useful in approaching problems where the optimal choice of calculation method depends on the expected size of the answer. For instance, a Fermi estimate might indicate whether the internal stresses of a structure are low enough that it can be accurately described by linear elasticity; or if the estimate already bears significant relationship in scale relative to some other value, for example, if a structure will be over-engineered to withstand loads several times greater than the estimate.

Although Fermi calculations are often not accurate, as there may be many problems with their assumptions, this sort of analysis does inform one what to look for to get a better answer. For the above example, one might try to find a better estimate of the number of pianos tuned by a piano tuner in a typical day, or look up an accurate number for the population of Chicago. It also gives a rough estimate that may be good enough for some purposes: if a person wants to start a store in Chicago that sells piano tuning equipment, and calculates that they need 10,000 potential customers to stay in business, they can reasonably assume that the above estimate is far enough below 10,000 that they should consider a different business plan (and, with a little more work, they could compute a rough upper bound on the number of piano tuners by considering the most extreme reasonable values that could appear in each of their assumptions).

== See also ==
- Copernican principle
- Dead reckoning
- Doomsday argument
- Guesstimate
- Handwaving
- Heuristic
- Order of approximation
- Spherical cow
- Stein's example
