= Hand-waving =

Term for attempting to be seen as effective

Hand-waving is a pejorative label for attempting to be seen as effective in word, reasoning, or deed, while actually doing nothing effective or substantial. It is often applied to debating techniques that involve fallacies, misdirection and the glossing over of details. It is also used academically to indicate unproven claims and skipped steps in proofs (sometimes intentionally, as in lectures and instructional materials), with some specific meanings in particular fields, including literary criticism, speculative fiction, mathematics, logic, science and engineering.

The term can additionally be used in work situations, when attempts are made to display productivity or assure accountability without actually resulting in them. The term can also be used as a self-admission of, and suggestion to defer discussion about, an allegedly unimportant weakness in one's own argument's evidence, to forestall an opponent dwelling on it. In debate competition, certain cases of this form of hand-waving may be explicitly permitted.

Hand-waving is an idiomatic metaphor, derived in part from the use of excessive gesticulation, perceived as unproductive, distracting or nervous, in communication or other effort. The term also evokes the sleight-of-hand distraction techniques of stage magic, and suggests that the speaker or writer seems to believe that if they, figuratively speaking, simply wave their hands, no one will notice or speak up about the holes in the reasoning. This implication of misleading intent has been reinforced by the pop-culture influence of the Star Wars franchise, in which mystically powerful hand-waving is fictionally used for mind control, and some uses of the term in public discourse are explicit Star Wars references.

Actual hand-waving motions may be used either by a speaker to indicate a desire to avoid going into details, or by critics to indicate that they believe the proponent of an argument is engaging in a verbal hand-wave inappropriately.

== Spelling and history ==
The spelling of the compound varies (both with regard to this idiom and the everyday human communication gesture of waving). While hand-waving is the most common spelling of the unitary present participle and gerund in this usage, and hand-wave of the simple present verb, hand wave dominates as the noun-phrase form. Handwaving and handwave may be preferred in some circles, and are well attested. "Hand waving" is mostly used otherwise, e.g. "she had one hand waving, the other on the rail", but is found in some dictionaries in this form. A more arch, mock-antiquarian construction is waving of [the] hands. Superlative constructions such as "vigorous hand-waving", "waved their hand[s] furiously", "lots of waving of hands", etc., are used to imply that the hand-waver lacks confidence in the information being conveyed, cannot convincingly express or defend the core of the argument being advanced. The descriptive epithet hand-waver has been applied to those engaging in hand-waving, but is not common. The opposite of hand-waving is sometimes called nose-following in mathematics.

However it is spelled, the expression is also used in the original literal meaning of gesturing in a greeting, departing, excited, or attention-seeking manner by waving the hands, as in "friendly were the hand-waving crowds ..." (— Sinclair Lewis), which dates to the mid-17th century as a hyphenated verb and the early 19th century United States as a fully compounded verb. It is unclear when the figurative usage arose. The Oxford Dictionary of English lists it as "extended use", and it appears primarily in modern American dictionaries, some of which label it as "informal".

== In debate, generally ==
Handwaving is frequently used in low-quality debate, including political campaigning and commentary, issue-based advocacy, advertising and public relations, tabloid journalism, opinion pieces, Internet memes, and informal discussion and writing. If the opponent in a debate or a commentator on an argument alleges hand-waving, it suggests that the proponent of the argument, position or message has engaged in one or more fallacies of logic, usually informal, and/or glossed over non-trivial details, and is attempting to wave away challenges and deflect questions, as if swatting at flies. The distraction inherent in the sense of the term has become a key part of the meaning. The fallacies in question vary, but often include one of the many variants of argument to emotion, and in political discourse frequently involve unjustified assignment or transference of blame. Hand-waving is not itself a fallacy; the proponent's argument may incidentally be correct despite their failure to properly support it. A tertiary meaning refers to use of poorly-reasoned arguments specifically to impress or to persuade.

The New Hacker's Dictionary (a.k.a. The Jargon File) observes:

If someone starts a sentence with "Clearly..." or "Obviously..." or "It is self-evident that...", it is a good bet he is about to handwave (alternatively, use of these constructions in a sarcastic tone before a paraphrase of someone else's argument suggests that it is a handwave). The theory behind this term is that if you wave your hands at the right moment, the listener may be sufficiently distracted to not notice that what you have said is bogus [i.e., incorrect]. Failing that, if a listener does object, you might try to dismiss the objection with a wave of your hand.

The implication that hand-waving is done with the specific intent to mislead has long been attached to the term, due to the use of literal waving of a hand – either natural-looking or showy, but never desperate – by illusionists to distract audiences and misdirect their attention from the mechanisms of the sleight-of-hand, gimmicked props or other trick being used in the performance. This meaning has become reinforced in recent decades by the influence of Star Wars (1977) and its sequels, in which the fictional Jedi mind trick involves a subtle hand wave with mystical powers – that only work on the weak-minded – to disguise reality and compel compliance. Consequently, there is an implication in current usage that a hand-waver may be craftily intending to deceive, and has a low opinion of the intelligence of the opponent or (especially) an audience or the general public. The labels "Jedi hand wave" and "Jedi mind trick" themselves are sometimes applied, in a tongue-in-cheek way, to this manipulation technique in public discourse; US Congressman Luke Messer's use of it in reference to President Barack Obama's 2016 State of the Union address generated headlines.

In an unplanned debate or presentation, an off-the-cuff essay, or an informal discussion, the proponent may have little or no time for preparation. Participants in such exchanges may use the term in reference to their own arguments, in the same sense as an author admitting a minor plot flaw. When the proponents use the term, they are conceding that they know an ancillary point of or intermediate step in their arguments is poorly supported; they are suggesting that such details are not important and do not affect their key arguments or conclusions, and that the hand-waved details should be excluded from current consideration. Examples include when they believe a statement is true but cannot prove it at that time, and when the sources upon which they are relying conflict in minor ways: "I'm hand-waving over the exact statistics here, but they all show at least a 20% increase, so let's move on".

In formal debate competition, certain forms of hand-waving may sometimes be explicitly permitted. In policy debate, the concept of fiat allows a team to pursue a line a reasoning based on a scenario that is not presently true, if a judge is satisfied that the case has been that it could become true.

== In literary criticism ==
By extension, handwaving is used in literary, film and other media criticism of speculative fiction to refer to a plot device (e.g., a scientific discovery, a political development, or rules governing the behavior of a fictional creature) that is left unexplained or sloppily explained because it is convenient to the story, with the implication that the writer is aware of the logical weakness but hopes the audience will not notice or will suspend disbelief regarding such a macguffin, deus ex machina, continuity error or plot hole.

The fictional material "handwavium" (a.k.a. "unobtainium", among other humorous names) is sometimes referred to in situations where the plot requires access to a substance of great value and properties that cannot be explained by real-world science, but is convenient to solving, or central to creating, a problem for the characters in the story. Perhaps the best known example is the spice melange, a fictional drug with supernatural properties, in Frank Herbert's far-future science-fantasy epic, Dune.

Hand-waving has come to be used in role-playing games to describe actions and conversations that are quickly glossed over, rather than acted out in full according to the rules. This may be done to keep from bogging down the play of the game with time-consuming but minor details.

== In mathematics ==
In mathematics, and disciplines in which mathematics plays a major role, hand-waving refers to either absence of formal proof or methods that do not meet mathematical rigor. In practice, it often involves the use of unrepresentative examples, unjustified assumptions, key omissions and faulty logic, and while these may be useful in expository papers and seminar presentations, they ultimately fall short of the standard of proof needed to establish a result. Proof by intimidation is one form of hand-waving.

The mathematical profession tends to be receptive to informed critiques from any listener, and a claimant to a new result is expected to be able to answer any such question with a logical argument, up to a full proof. Should a speaker apparently fail to give such an answer, anyone in the audience who can supply the needed demonstration may sometimes upstage the speaker. The objector in such a case might receive some measure credit for the theorem the hand-waver presented. The opposite of hand-waving in mathematics (and related fields) is sometimes called nose-following, which refers to the unimaginative development of a narrow line of reasoning that—while correct—can also end up making the subject dry and uninteresting.

The rationale for this culture of hyper-critical scrutiny is suggested by a quote of G. H. Hardy: "[A mathematician's] subject is the most curious of all—there is none in which truth plays such odd pranks. It has the most elaborate and the most fascinating technique, and gives unrivalled openings for the display of sheer professional skill."

== In applied science and engineering ==
Hand-waving arguments in engineering and other applied sciences often include order-of-magnitude estimates and dimensional analysis, especially in the use of Fermi problems in physics and engineering education. However, competent, well-intentioned researchers and professors also rely on explicitly declared hand-waving when, given a limited time, a large result must be shown and minor technical details cannot be given much attention—e.g., "it can be shown that z is an even number", as an intermediary step in reaching a conclusion.

Another example of hand-waving can be found in the oversimplifications of the geologic representations commonly used in groundwater models created in support of land-development applications, especially those involving metal mining and aggregate extraction.

Back-of-the-envelope calculations are approximate ways to get an answer by over-simplification, and are comparable to hand-waving in this sense.

== In business ==
Hand-waving has been used to describe work-related situations where productivity is seemingly displayed, but deliverables are not produced, especially in the context of intentional engagement in busy work or pretend-work, vague claims of overwork or complications, impenetrably buzzword-laden rationalizations for delays or otherwise poor performance, and plausible-sounding but weak excuse-making and attention-deflecting tactics. In employment situations, as in political discourse, a hand-waving effort may seek to shift blame to other parties.

Another use is in reference to fiscal problems, such as an inability to adequately explain accounting discrepancies or an avoidance of accountability for missing funds.

== See also ==
- List of logical fallacies
- Proof by example
- Proof by intimidation
