= Cellular space =

Type of Hausdorff space in topology

A cellular space is a compact Hausdorff space that has the structure of a CW complex.
