= Guesstimate =

Estimate made without using adequate or complete information

Guesstimate is an informal English portmanteau of guess and estimate, first used by American statisticians in 1934 or 1935. It is defined as an estimate made without using adequate or complete information, or, more strongly, as an estimate arrived at by guesswork or conjecture. Like the words estimate and guess, guesstimate may be used as a verb or a noun (with the same change in pronunciation as estimate). A guesstimate may be a first rough approximation pending a more accurate estimate, or it may be an educated guess at something for which no better information will become available.

The word may be used in a pejorative sense if information for a better estimate is available but ignored.

Guesstimation techniques are used:

- in physics, where the use of guesstimation techniques to solve Fermi problems is taught as a useful skill to science students;
- in cosmology, where the Drake equation is a well-known guesstimation method;
- in economics, where economic forecasts and statistics are often based on guesstimates; and
- in software engineering, where new development of features and release timelines are based on effort guesstimates of tasks.

Lawrence Weinstein and John Adam's 2009 book Guesstimation: Solving the World's Problems on the Back of a Cocktail Napkin, based on the course "Physics on the Back of an Envelope" at Old Dominion University, promotes guesstimation techniques as a useful life skill. It includes many worked examples of guesstimation, including estimating the total number of miles that Americans drive in a year (about 2 trillion) and the amount of high-level nuclear waste that a 1 GW nuclear power plant produces in a year (about 60 tons).

== See also ==
- Ansatz
- Back-of-the-envelope calculation
- Heuristic
- Scientific wild-ass guess

== Sources ==
- Weinstein, Lawrence; Adam, John A. (2008). Guesstimation: Solving the World's Problems on the Back of a Cocktail Napkin. Princeton University Press. ISBN 978-0-691-12949-5.
