= Symplectic space =

A symplectic space may refer to:

- Symplectic manifold
- Symplectic vector space
