= Proof by example =

Erroneous method of proof

In logic and mathematics, proof by example (sometimes known as inappropriate generalization) is a logical fallacy whereby the validity of a statement is illustrated through one or more examples or cases—rather than a full-fledged proof.

The structure, argument form and formal form of a proof by example generally proceeds as follows:

Structure:

I know that X is such.
Therefore, anything related to X is also such.

Argument form:

I know that x, which is a member of group X, has the property P.
Therefore, all other elements of X must have the property P.

Formal form:

$$\exists x:P(x)\;\;\vdash\;\;\forall x:P(x)$$

The following example demonstrates why this line of reasoning is a logical fallacy:

I've seen a person shoot someone dead.
Therefore, all people are murderers.

In the common discourse, a proof by example can also be used to describe an attempt to establish a claim using statistically insignificant examples. In which case, the merit of each argument might have to be assessed on an individual basis.

== Valid cases of proof by example ==
In certain circumstances, examples can suffice as logically valid proof.

=== Proofs of existential statements ===
In some scenarios, an argument by example may be valid if it leads from a singular premise to an existential conclusion (i.e. proving that a claim is true for at least one case, instead of for all cases). For example:

Socrates is wise.
Therefore, someone is wise.

(or)

I've seen a person steal.
Therefore, (some) people can steal.

These examples outline the informal version of the logical rule known as existential introduction, also known as particularisation or existential generalization:

Existential Introduction
$$\frac{\varphi(\beta / \alpha)}{\exists \alpha\, \varphi}$$

(where $\varphi(\beta / \alpha)$ denotes the formula formed by substituting all free occurrences of the variable $\alpha$ in $\varphi$ by $\beta$.)

Likewise, finding a counterexample disproves (proves the negation of) a universal conclusion. This is used in a proof by contradiction.

=== Exhaustive proofs ===
Examples also constitute a valid, if inelegant, proof, when it has also been demonstrated that the examples treated cover all possible cases.

In mathematics, proof by example can also be used to refer to attempts to illustrate a claim by proving cases of the claim, with the understanding that these cases contain key ideas which can be generalized into a full-fledged proof.

== See also ==
- Affirming the consequent
- Anecdotal evidence
- Bayesian probability
- Counterexample
- Hand-waving
- Inductive reasoning
  - Problem of induction
- Modus ponens
- Proof by construction
- Proof by intimidation
