= Proof by intimidation =

Marking an argument as obvious or trivial

Proof by intimidation (or argumentum verbosum) is a humorous phrase used mainly in mathematics to refer to a specific form of hand-waving whereby one attempts to advance an argument by giving an argument loaded with jargon and obscure results or by marking it as obvious or trivial. It attempts to intimidate the audience into simply accepting the result without evidence by appealing to their ignorance or lack of understanding.

The phrase is often used when the author is an authority in their field, presenting their proof to people who respect a priori the author's insistence of the validity of the proof, while in other cases, the author might simply claim that their statement is true because it is trivial or because they say so. Usage of this phrase is for the most part in good humour, though it can also appear in serious criticism. A proof by intimidation is often associated with phrases such as:

- "Clearly..."
- "It is self-evident that..."
- "It can be easily shown that..."
- "... does not warrant a proof."
- "The proof is left as an exercise for the reader."
- "It is trivial..."

Outside mathematics, "proof by intimidation" is also cited by critics of junk science, to describe cases in which scientific evidence is thrown aside in favour of dubious arguments – such as those presented to the public by articulate advocates who pose as experts in their field.

Proof by intimidation may also back valid assertions. Ronald A. Fisher claimed in the book credited with the new evolutionary synthesis, "...by the analogy of compound interest the present value of the future offspring of persons aged x is easily seen to be...", thence presenting a novel integral-laden definition of reproductive value. At this, Hal Caswell remarked, "With all due respect to Fisher, I have yet to meet anyone who finds this equation 'easily seen.'" Valid proofs were provided by subsequent researchers such as Leo A. Goodman (1968).

Whenever I meet in Laplace with the words "Thus it plainly appears," I am sure that hours, and perhaps days, of hard study will alone enable me to discover how it plainly appears.

— Nathaniel Bowditch, Memoir of Nathaniel Bowditch (1839) p. 62.

In a memoir, Gian-Carlo Rota claimed that the expression "proof by intimidation" was coined by Mark Kac, to describe a technique used by William Feller in his lectures:

He took umbrage when someone interrupted his lecturing by pointing out some glaring mistake. He became red in the face and raised his voice, often to full shouting range. It was reported that on occasion he had asked the objector to leave the classroom. The expression "proof by intimidation" was coined after Feller's lectures (by Mark Kac). During a Feller lecture, the hearer was made to feel privy to some wondrous secret, one that often vanished by magic as he walked out of the classroom at the end of the period. Like many great teachers, Feller was a bit of a con man.

— Rota, Gian-Carlo (1997). Indiscrete thoughts. Palombi, Fabrizio, 1965–. Boston: Birkhäuser. ISBN 0-8176-3866-0. OCLC 34029702.

Newton's astonishing grasp of the entire problem of planetary perturbations and the power of his insight are clearly apparent, this part of the Principia is also among the most difficult to grasp because of the paucity of any real explanation and an apparent attempt to conceal details by recourse, too often, to phrases like "hence it comes to pass", "by like reasoning", and "it is manifest that" at crucial points of the argument. This "secretive style" is nowhere present, to the same extent, in the Principia.

— Subrahmanyan Chandrasekhar, Chandrasekhar, S. (1995). Newton's Principia for the common reader. Oxford: Oxford; New York: Clarendon Press; Oxford University Press. p. 258. ISBN 978-0-19-851744-3.

== See also ==
- Argument from authority – Logical fallacy
- Chewbacca defense – Nonsensical diversionary legal defense
- Gish gallop – Rapid-fire argument rhetorical technique
- Obscurantism – Practice of obscuring information
- Proof by example – Erroneous method of proof
