= Mathematical structure =

Additional mathematical object

In mathematics, a structure on a set (or on some sets) refers to providing or endowing it (or them) with certain additional features (e.g. an operation, relation, metric, or topology). Τhe additional features are attached or related to the set (or to the sets), so as to provide it (or them) with some additional meaning or significance.

A partial list of possible structures is measures, algebraic structures (groups, fields, etc.), topologies, metric structures (geometries), orders, graphs, events, differential structures, categories, setoids, and equivalence relations.

Sometimes, a set is endowed with more than one feature simultaneously, which allows to study the interaction between the different structures more richly. For example, an ordering imposes a rigid form, shape, or topology on a set, and if a set has both a topology feature and a group feature, such that these two features are compatible in a certain way, then the structure becomes a topological group.

A map between two similarly-structured sets that preserves their structure is known as a morphism, and such maps are of special interest in many fields of mathematics. Examples include homomorphisms, which preserve algebraic structures; continuous functions, which preserve topological structures; and differentiable functions, which preserve differential structures. Morphisms that can be inverted, known as isomorphisms, allow to describe when sets endowed with the same kind of structure have the same properties from the point of view of that structure, in which case they are called isomorphic.

== History ==
In 1939, the French group with the pseudonym "Nicolas Bourbaki" saw structures as the root of mathematics. They first mentioned them in their "Fascicule" of Theory of Sets and expanded it into Chapter IV of the 1957 edition. They identified three mother structures: algebraic, topological, and order.

== Example: the real numbers ==
The set of real numbers has several standard structures:

- An order: each number is either less than or greater than any other number.
- Algebraic structure: there are operations of addition and multiplication, the first of which makes it into a group and the pair of which together make it into a field.
- A measure: intervals of the real line have a specific length, which can be extended to the Lebesgue measure on many of its subsets.
- A metric: there is a notion of distance between points.
- A geometry: it is equipped with a metric and is flat.
- A topology: there is a notion of open sets.

There are interfaces among these:

- Its order and, independently, its metric structure induce its topology.
- Its order and algebraic structure make it into an ordered field.
- Its algebraic structure and topology make it into a Lie group, a type of topological group.

== See also ==
- Abstract structure
- Algebraic structure
- Category (mathematics)
- Equivalent definitions of mathematical structures
- Forgetful functor
- Intuitionistic type theory
- Mathematical object
- Space (mathematics)
