= Back-of-the-envelope calculation =

Metaphor for a rough calculation

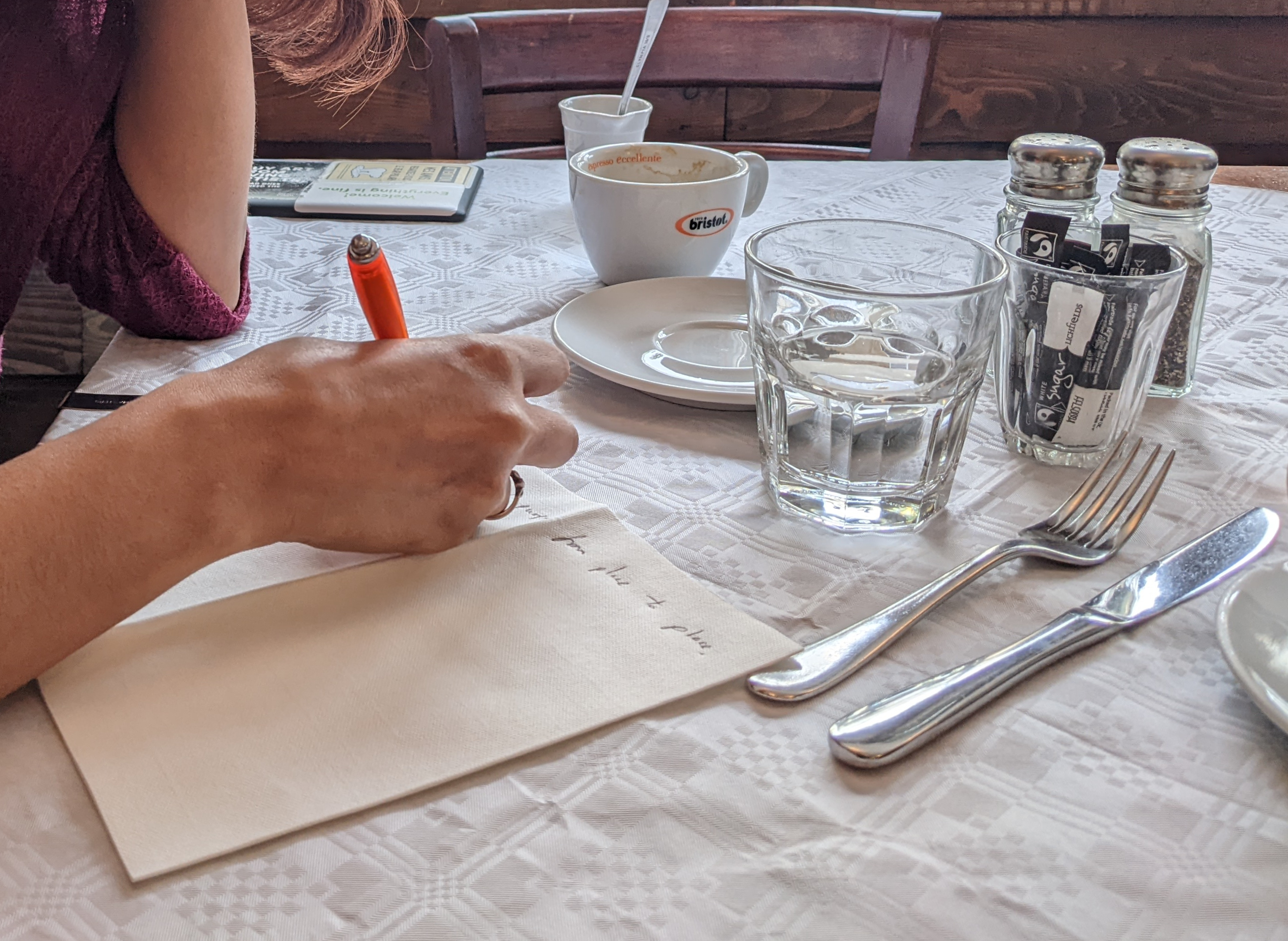
Notes being made on a napkin

A back-of-the-envelope calculation is a rough calculation, typically jotted down on any available scrap of paper such as an envelope. It is more than a guess but less than an accurate calculation or mathematical proof. The defining characteristic of back-of-the-envelope calculations is the use of simplified assumptions.

A similar phrase in the US is back of a napkin, also used in the business world to describe sketching out a quick, rough idea of a business or product. In British English, a similar idiom is back of a fag packet, referring to a cigarette pack.

== History ==
In the natural sciences, back-of-the-envelope calculation is often associated with physicist Enrico Fermi, who was well known for emphasizing ways that complex scientific equations could be approximated within an order of magnitude using simple calculations. He went on to develop a series of sample calculations, which are called "Fermi Questions" or "Back-of-the-Envelope Calculations" and used to solve Fermi problems.

Fermi was known for getting quick and accurate answers to problems that would stump other people. The most famous instance came during the first atomic bomb test in New Mexico on 16 July 1945. As the blast wave reached him, Fermi dropped bits of paper. By measuring the distance they were blown, he could compare to a previously computed table and thus estimate the bomb energy yield. He estimated 10 kilotons of TNT; the measured result was 18.6.

Perhaps the most influential example of such a calculation was carried out over a period of a few hours by Arnold Wilkins after being asked to consider a problem by Robert Watson-Watt. Watt had learned that the Germans claimed to have invented a radio-based death ray, but Wilkins' one-page calculations demonstrated that such a thing was almost certainly impossible. When Watt asked what role radio might play, Wilkins replied that it might be useful for detection at long range, a suggestion that led to the rapid development of radar and the Chain Home system.

Another example is Victor Weisskopf's pamphlet Modern Physics from an Elementary Point of View. In these notes Weisskopf used back-of-the-envelope calculations to calculate the size of a hydrogen atom, a star, and a mountain, all using elementary physics.

== Examples ==
In a video interview for the University of California, Berkeley on the 50th anniversary of the laser, Nobel laureate Charles Townes described how he pulled an envelope from his pocket while sitting in a park and wrote down calculations during his initial insight into lasers.

An important Internet protocol, the Border Gateway Protocol, was sketched out in 1989 by engineers on the back of "three ketchup-stained napkins", and is still known as the three-napkin protocol.

UTF-8, the dominant character encoding for the World Wide Web, was designed by Ken Thompson and Rob Pike on a placemat.

The Bailey bridge is a type of portable, pre-fabricated, truss bridge and was extensively used by British, Canadian and US military engineering units. Donald Bailey drew the original design for the bridge on the back of an envelope.

The Laffer Curve, which claims to show the relationship between tax cuts and government income, was drawn by Arthur Laffer in 1974 on a bar napkin to show an aide to President Gerald R. Ford why the federal government should cut taxes.

Upon hearing that the S-IV 2nd Stage of the Saturn I would need transport from California to Florida for launch as part of the Apollo program, Jack Conroy sketched the cavernous cargo airplane, the Pregnant Guppy.

The Video Toaster was designed on placemats in a Topeka pizza restaurant.

== See also ==
- Buckingham π theorem, a technique often used in fluid mechanics to obtain order-of-magnitude estimates
- Guesstimate
- Scientific Wild-Ass Guess
- Heuristic
- Order-of-magnitude analysis
- Rule of thumb
- Sanity testing
- Fermi Problem
