= List of order theory topics =

Order theory is a branch of mathematics that studies various kinds of objects (often binary relations) that capture the intuitive notion of ordering, providing a framework for saying when one thing is "less than" or "precedes" another.

An alphabetical list of many notions of order theory can be found in the order theory glossary. See also inequality, extreme value and mathematical optimization.

== Overview ==
- Partially ordered set
- Preorder
- Totally ordered set
  - Total preorder
  - Chain
  - Trichotomy
  - Extended real number line
- Antichain
- Strict order
- Hasse diagram
  - Directed acyclic graph
- Duality (order theory)
- Product order

== Distinguished elements of partial orders ==
- Greatest element (maximum, top, unit), Least element (minimum, bottom, zero)
- Maximal element, minimal element
- Upper bound
  - Least upper bound (supremum, join)
  - Greatest lower bound (infimum, meet)
  - Limit superior and limit inferior
- Irreducible element
- Prime element
- Compact element

== Subsets of partial orders ==
- Cofinal and coinitial set, sometimes also called dense
- Meet-dense set and join-dense set
- Linked set (upwards and downwards)
- Directed set (upwards and downwards)
- centered and σ-centered set
- Net (mathematics)
- Upper set and lower set
- Ideal and filter
  - Ultrafilter

== Special types of partial orders ==
- Completeness (order theory)
- Dense order
- Distributivity (order theory)
  - Modular lattice
  - Distributive lattice
  - Completely distributive lattice
- Ascending chain condition
  - Infinite descending chain
- Countable chain condition, often abbreviated as ccc
- Knaster's condition, sometimes denoted property (K)

=== Well-orders ===
- Well-founded relation
- Ordinal number
- Well-quasi-ordering

=== Completeness properties ===
- Semilattice
- Lattice
- (Directed) complete partial order, (d)cpo
- Bounded complete
- Complete lattice
  - Knaster–Tarski theorem
- Infinite divisibility

=== Orders with further algebraic operations ===
- Heyting algebra
  - Relatively complemented lattice
- Complete Heyting algebra
  - Pointless topology
- MV-algebra
- Ockham algebras:
  - Stone algebra
  - De Morgan algebra
    - Kleene algebra (with involution)
    - Łukasiewicz–Moisil algebra
  - Boolean algebra (structure)
    - Boolean ring
    - Complete Boolean algebra
- Orthocomplemented lattice
- Quantale

=== Orders in algebra ===
- Partially ordered monoid
- Ordered group
  - Archimedean property
- Ordered ring
- Ordered field
- Artinian ring
- Noetherian
- Linearly ordered group
- Monomial order
- Weak order of permutations
- Bruhat order on a Coxeter group
- Incidence algebra

== Functions between partial orders ==
- Monotonic
- Pointwise order of functions
- Galois connection
- Order embedding
- Order isomorphism
- Closure operator
- Functions that preserve suprema/infima

== Completions and free constructions ==
- Dedekind completion
- Ideal completion

== Domain theory ==
- Way-below relation
- Continuous poset
  - Continuous lattice
- Algebraic poset
  - Scott domain
  - Algebraic lattice
- Scott information system
- Powerdomain
- Scott topology
- Scott continuity

== Orders in mathematical logic ==
- Lindenbaum algebra
- Zorn's lemma
  - Hausdorff maximality theorem
- Boolean prime ideal theorem
- Ultrafilter
- Ultrafilter lemma
- Tree (set theory)
- Tree (descriptive set theory)
- Suslin's problem
- Absorption law
- Prewellordering

== Orders in topology ==
- Stone duality
  - Stone's representation theorem for Boolean algebras
- Specialization (pre)order
- Order topology of a total order (open interval topology)
- Alexandrov topology
- Upper topology
- Scott topology
  - Scott continuity
- Lawson topology
- Finer topology
