= Saturated set (intersection of open sets) =

In general topology, a saturated set is a subset of a topological space equal to an intersection of (an arbitrary number of) open sets.

== Definition ==
Let $S$ be a subset of a topological space $X$. The saturation $\operatorname{sat}(S)$ of $S$ is the intersection of all the neighborhoods of $S$.
$$\operatorname{sat}(S)=\bigcap\mathcal N_S$$
Here $\mathcal N_S$ denotes the neighborhood filter of $S$. The neighborhood filter $\mathcal N_S$ can be replaced by any local basis of $S$. In particular, $\operatorname{sat}(S)$ is the intersection of all open sets containing $S$.

Let $S$ be a subset of a topological space $X$. Then the following conditions are equivalent.

- $S$ is the intersection of a set of open sets of $X$.
- $S$ equals its own saturation.

We say that $S$ is saturated if it satisfies the above equivalent conditions. We say that $S$ is recurrent if it intersects every non-empty saturated set of $X$.

== Properties ==
=== Implications ===
Every G_{δ} set is saturated, obvious by definition. Every recurrent set is dense, also obvious by definition.

=== In relation to compactness ===
A subset of a topological space is compact if and only if its saturation is compact.

For a topological space $X$, the following are equivalent.

- Every point $x\in X$ has a compact local basis. (This is one of several definitions of locally compact spaces.)
- Every point $x\in X$ has a compact saturated local basis.

In a sober space, the intersection of a downward-directed set of compact saturated sets is again compact and saturated. This is a sober variant of the Cantor intersection theorem.

=== In relation to Baire spaces ===
For a topological space $X$, the following are equivalent.

- $X$ is a Baire space.
- Every recurrent set of $X$ is Baire.
- $X$ has a Baire recurrent set.

== Examples ==
For a topological space $X$, the following are equivalent.

- Every subset of $X$ is saturated.
- The only recurrent set of $X$ is $X$ itself.
- $X$ is a T_{1} space.

A subset $S$ of a preordered set $(X,\lesssim)$ is saturated with respect to the Scott topology if and only if it is upward-closed.

Let $(X,\lesssim)$ be a closed preordered set (one in which every chain has an upper bound). Let $\max X$ be the set of maximal elements of $X$. By the Zorn lemma, $\max X$ is a recurrent set of $X$ with the Scott topology.
