= Cofinal =

Cofinal may refer to:

- Cofinal (mathematics), the property of a subset B of a preordered set A such that for every element of A there is a "larger element" in B
  - Cofinality (mathematics), the least cardinality of a cofinal subset in this sense
- Cofinal (music), a part of some Gregorian chants
