= Sober space =

Topological space whose topology is fully captured by its lattice of open sets

In mathematics, a sober space is a topological space X such that every (nonempty) irreducible closed subset of X is the closure of exactly one point of X: that is, every nonempty irreducible closed subset has a unique generic point.

== Definitions ==
Sober spaces have a variety of cryptomorphic definitions, which are documented in this section. In each case below, replacing "unique" with "at most one" gives an equivalent formulation of the T_{0} axiom. Replacing it with "at least one" is equivalent to the property that the T_{0} quotient of the space is sober, which is sometimes referred to as having "enough points" in the literature.

=== With irreducible closed sets ===
A closed set is irreducible if it cannot be written as the union of two proper closed subsets. A space is sober if every nonempty irreducible closed subset is the closure of a unique point.

=== In terms of morphisms of frames and locales ===
A topological space X is sober if every map from its partially ordered set of open subsets to {0, 1} that preserves all joins and all finite meets is the inverse image of a unique continuous function from the one-point space to X.

This may be viewed as a correspondence between the notion of a point in a locale and a point in a topological space, which is the motivating definition.

=== Using completely prime filters ===
A filter F of open sets is said to be completely prime if for any family $O_i$ of open sets such that $\bigcup_i O_i \in F$, we have that $O_i \in F$ for some i. A space X is sober if each completely prime filter is the neighbourhood filter of a unique point in X.

=== In terms of nets ===
A net $x_{\bullet}$ is self-convergent if it converges to every point $x_i$ in $x_{\bullet}$, or equivalently if its eventuality filter is completely prime. A net $x_{\bullet}$ that converges to $x$ converges strongly if it can only converge to points in the closure of $x$. A space is sober if every self-convergent net $x_{\bullet}$ converges strongly to a unique point $x$.

In particular, a space is T_{1} and sober precisely if every self-convergent net is constant.

=== As a property of sheaves on the space ===
A space X is sober if every functor from the category of sheaves Sh(X) to Set that preserves all finite limits and all small colimits must be the stalk functor of a unique point x.

== Properties and examples ==
Any Hausdorff (T_{2}) space is sober (the only irreducible subsets being singletons), and all sober spaces are Kolmogorov (T_{0}), and both implications are strict.

Sobriety is not comparable to the T_{1} condition:

- an example of a T_{1} space that is not sober is an infinite set with the cofinite topology, the whole space being an irreducible closed subset with no generic point;
- an example of a sober space that is not T_{1} is the Sierpinski space.

Moreover, T_{2} is strictly stronger than T_{1} and sober, i.e., while every T_{2} space is at once T_{1} and sober, there exist spaces that are simultaneously T_{1} and sober, but not T_{2}. One such example is the following: let X be the set of real numbers, with a new point p adjoined; the open sets being all real open sets, and all cofinite sets containing p.

Sobriety of X is precisely a condition that forces the lattice of open subsets of X to determine X up to homeomorphism, which is relevant to pointless topology.

Sobriety makes the specialization preorder a directed complete partial order.

Every continuous directed complete poset equipped with the Scott topology is sober.

Finite T_{0} spaces are sober.

The prime spectrum Spec(R) of a commutative ring R with the Zariski topology is a compact sober space. In fact, every spectral space (i.e. a compact sober space for which the collection of compact open subsets is closed under finite intersections and forms a base for the topology) is homeomorphic to Spec(R) for some commutative ring R. This is a theorem of Melvin Hochster. More generally, the underlying topological space of any scheme is a sober space.

The subset of Spec(R) consisting only of the maximal ideals, where R is a commutative ring, is not sober in general.

== See also ==
- Stone duality, on the duality between topological spaces that are sober and frames (i.e. complete Heyting algebras) that are spatial.
