= Closed preordered set =

In mathematics, a closed preordered set is one whose anti-well-ordered subsets have lower bounds.

== Definition ==
Let $\kappa$ be a cardinal. A preordered set $(P,\lesssim)$ is called $\kappa$-closed if every subset of $P$ whose opposite is well-ordered with order-type less than $\kappa$ has a lower bound.

A preordered set is ${<}\kappa$-closed if it is $\lambda$-closed for every $\lambda<\kappa$. A preordered set is called closed or ${<}{\operatorname{Ord}}$-closed if it is $\kappa$-closed for every $\kappa$.

A preordered set is inductive if every chain has an upper bound. Since every totally ordered set has a well-ordered cofinal subset, this is equivalent to saying that the preordered set is the opposite of a closed preordered set.

== Properties ==
Inductive preordered sets satisfy Zorn's lemma and the Bourbaki–Witt theorem.

A $\kappa$-closed forcing preserves cofinalities less than or equal to $\kappa$, hence cardinals less than or equal to $\kappa$.
