= Subnet (mathematics) =

Generalization of the concept of subsequence to the case of nets

In topology and related areas of mathematics, a subnet is a generalization of the concept of subsequence to the case of nets. The analogue of "subsequence" for nets is the notion of a "subnet". The definition is not completely straightforward, but is designed to allow as many theorems about subsequences to generalize to nets as possible.

There are three non-equivalent definitions of "subnet". The first definition of a subnet was introduced by John L. Kelley in 1955 and later, Stephen Willard introduced his own (non-equivalent) variant of Kelley's definition in 1970. Subnets in the sense of Willard and subnets in the sense of Kelley are the most commonly used definitions of "subnet" but they are each not equivalent to the concept of "subordinate filter", which is the analog of "subsequence" for filters (they are not equivalent in the sense that there exist subordinate filters on $X = \N$ whose filter/subordinate–filter relationship cannot be described in terms of the corresponding net/subnet relationship). A third definition of "subnet" (not equivalent to those given by Kelley or Willard) that is equivalent to the concept of "subordinate filter" was introduced independently by Smiley (1957), Aarnes and Andenaes (1972), Murdeshwar (1983), and possibly others, although it is not often used.

This article discusses the definition due to Willard (the other definitions are described in the article Filters in topology#Non–equivalence of subnets and subordinate filters).

== Definitions ==
There are several different non-equivalent definitions of "subnet" and this article will use the definition introduced in 1970 by Stephen Willard, which is as follows: If $x_{\bull} = \left(x_a\right)_{a \in A}$ and $s_{\bull} = \left(s_i\right)_{i \in I}$ are nets in a set $X$ from directed sets $A$ and $I,$ respectively, then $s_{\bull}$ is said to be a subnet of $x_{\bull}$ (in the sense of Willard or a Willard–subnet) if there exists a monotone final function
$$h : I \to A$$
such that
$$s_i = x_{h(i)} \quad \text{ for all } i \in I.$$
A function $h : I \to A$ is monotone, order-preserving, and an order homomorphism if whenever $i \leq j$ then $h(i) \leq h(j)$ and it is called final if its image $h(I)$ is cofinal in $A.$ The set $h(I)$ being cofinal in $A$ means that for every $a \in A,$ there exists some $b \in h(I)$ such that $b \geq a;$ that is, for every $a \in A$ there exists an $i \in I$ such that $h(i) \geq a.$ (Note: Some authors use a more general definition of a subnet. In this definition, the map $h$ is required to satisfy the condition: For every $a \in A$ there exists a $b_0 \in B$ such that $h(b) \geq a$ whenever $b \geq b_0.$ Such a map is final but not necessarily monotone.)

Since the net $x_{\bull}$ is the function $x_{\bull} : A \to X$ and the net $s_{\bull}$ is the function $s_{\bull} : I \to X,$ the defining condition $\left(s_i\right)_{i \in I} = \left(x_{h(i)}\right)_{i \in I},$ may be written more succinctly and cleanly as either $s_{\bull} = x_{h(\bull)}$ or $s_{\bull} = x_{\bull} \circ h,$ where $\,\circ\,$ denotes function composition and $x_{h(\bull)} := \left(x_{h(i)}\right)_{i \in I}$ is just notation for the function $x_{\bull} \circ h : I \to X.$

== Subnets versus subsequences ==
Importantly, a subnet is not merely the restriction of a net $\left(x_a\right)_{a \in A}$ to a directed subset of its domain $A.$ In contrast, by definition, a subsequence of a given sequence $x_1, x_2, x_3, \ldots$ is a sequence formed from the given sequence by deleting some of the elements without disturbing the relative positions of the remaining elements. Explicitly, a sequence $\left(s_n\right)_{n \in \N}$ is said to be a subsequence of $\left(x_i\right)_{i \in \N}$ if there exists a strictly increasing sequence of positive integers $h_1 < h_2 < h_3 < \cdots$ such that $s_n = x_{h_n}$ for every $n \in \N$ (that is to say, such that $\left(s_1, s_2, \ldots\right) = \left(x_{h_1}, x_{h_2}, \ldots\right)$). The sequence $\left(h_n\right)_{n \in \N} = \left(h_1, h_2, \ldots\right)$ can be canonically identified with the function $h_{\bull} : \N \to \N$ defined by $n \mapsto h_n.$ Thus a sequence $s_{\bull} = \left(s_n\right)_{n \in \N}$ is a subsequence of $x_{\bull} = \left(x_i\right)_{i \in \N}$ if and only if there exists a strictly increasing function $h : \N \to \N$ such that $s_{\bull} = x_{\bull} \circ h.$

Subsequences are subnets

Every subsequence is a subnet because if $\left(x_{h_n}\right)_{n \in \N}$ is a subsequence of $\left(x_i\right)_{i \in \N}$ then the map $h : \N \to \N$ defined by $n \mapsto h_n$ is an order-preserving map whose image is cofinal in its codomain and satisfies $x_{h_n} = x_{h(n)}$ for all $n \in \N.$

Sequence and subnet but not a subsequence

The sequence $\left(s_i\right)_{i \in \N} := (1, 1, 2, 2, 3, 3, \ldots)$ is not a subsequence of $\left(x_i\right)_{i \in \N} := (1, 2, 3, \ldots)$ although it is a subnet because the map $h : \N \to \N$ defined by $h(i) := \left\lfloor \tfrac{i + 1}{2} \right\rfloor$ is an order-preserving map whose image is $h(\N) = \N$ and satisfies $s_i = x_{h(i)}$ for all $i \in \N.$ (Note: Indeed, this is because $x_i = i$ and $s_i = h(i)$ for every $i \in \N;$ in other words, when considered as functions on $\N,$ the sequence $x_{\bull}$ is just the identity map on $\N$ while $s_{\bull} = h.$)

While a sequence is a net, a sequence has subnets that are not subsequences. The key difference is that subnets can use the same point in the net multiple times and the indexing set of the subnet can have much larger cardinality. Using the more general definition where we do not require monotonicity, a sequence is a subnet of a given sequence, if and only if it can be obtained from some subsequence by repeating its terms and reordering them.

Subnet of a sequence that is not a sequence

A subnet of a sequence is not necessarily a sequence. For an example, let $I = \{r \in \R : r > 0\}$ be directed by the usual order $\,\leq\,$ and define $h : I \to \N$ by letting $h(r) = \lceil r \rceil$ be the ceiling of $r.$ Then $h : (I, \leq) \to (\N, \leq)$ is an order-preserving map (because it is a non-decreasing function) whose image $h(I) = \N$ is a cofinal subset of its codomain. Let $x_{\bull} = \left(x_i\right)_{i \in \N} : \N \to X$ be any sequence (such as a constant sequence, for instance) and let $s_r := x_{h(r)}$ for every $r \in I$ (in other words, let $s_{\bull} := x_{\bull} \circ h$). This net $\left(s_r\right)_{r \in I}$ is not a sequence since its domain $I$ is an uncountable set. However, $\left(s_r\right)_{r \in I}$ is a subnet of the sequence $x_{\bull}$ since (by definition) $s_r = x_{h(r)}$ holds for every $r \in I.$ Thus $s_{\bull}$ is a subnet of $x_{\bull}$ that is not a sequence.

Furthermore, the sequence $x_{\bull}$ is also a subnet of $\left(s_r\right)_{r \in I}$ since the inclusion map $\iota : \N \to I$ (that sends $n \mapsto n$) is an order-preserving map whose image $\iota(\N) = \N$ is a cofinal subset of its codomain and $x_n = s_{\iota(n)}$ holds for all $n \in \N.$ Thus $x_{\bull}$ and $\left(s_r\right)_{r \in I}$ are (simultaneously) subnets of each another.

Subnets induced by subsets

Suppose $I \subseteq \N$ is an infinite set and $\left(x_i\right)_{i \in \N}$ is a sequence. Then $\left(x_i\right)_{i \in I}$ is a net on $(I, \leq)$ that is also a subnet of $\left(x_i\right)_{i \in \N}$ (take $h : I \to \N$ to be the inclusion map $i \mapsto i$). This subnet $\left(x_i\right)_{i \in I}$ in turn induces a subsequence $\left(x_{h_n}\right)_{n \in \N}$ by defining $h_n$ as the $n^{\text{th}}$ smallest value in $I$ (that is, let $h_1 := \inf I$ and let $h_n := \inf \{i \in I : i > h_{n-1}\}$ for every integer $n > 1$). In this way, every infinite subset of $I \subseteq \N$ induces a canonical subnet that may be written as a subsequence. However, as demonstrated below, not every subnet of a sequence is a subsequence.

== Applications ==
The definition generalizes some key theorems about subsequences:

- A net $x_{\bull}$ converges to $x$ if and only if every subnet of $x_{\bull}$ converges to $x.$
- A net $x_{\bull}$ has a cluster point $y$ if and only if it has a subnet $y_{\bull}$ that converges to $y$
- A topological space $X$ is compact if and only if every net in $X$ has a convergent subnet (see net for a proof).

Taking $h$ be the identity map in the definition of "subnet" and requiring $B$ to be a cofinal subset of $A$ leads to the concept of a cofinal subnet, which turns out to be inadequate since, for example, the second theorem above fails for the Tychonoff plank if we restrict ourselves to cofinal subnets.

=== Clustering and closure ===
If $s_{\bull}$ is a net in a subset $S \subseteq X$ and if $x \in X$ is a cluster point of $s_{\bull}$ then $x \in \operatorname{cl}_X S.$ In other words, every cluster point of a net in a subset belongs to the closure of that set.

If $x_{\bull} = \left(x_a\right)_{a \in A}$ is a net in $X$ then the set of all cluster points of $x_{\bull}$ in $X$ is equal to
$$\bigcap_{a \in A} \operatorname{cl}_X \left(x_{\geq a}\right)$$
where $x_{\geq a} := \left\{x_b : b \geq a, b \in A\right\}$ for each $a \in A.$

=== Convergence versus clustering ===
If a net converges to a point $x$ then $x$ is necessarily a cluster point of that net. The converse is not guaranteed in general. That is, it is possible for $x \in X$ to be a cluster point of a net $x_{\bull}$ but for $x_{\bull}$ to not converge to $x.$ However, if $x_{\bull} = \left(x_a\right)_{a \in A}$ clusters at $x \in X$ then there exists a subnet of $x_{\bull}$ that converges to $x.$ This subnet can be explicitly constructed from $(A, \leq)$ and the neighborhood filter $\mathcal{N}_x$ at $x$ as follows: make
$$I := \left\{(a, U) \in A \times \mathcal{N}_x : x_a \in U\right\}$$
into a directed set by declaring that
$$(a, U) \leq (b, V) \quad \text{ if and only if } \quad a \leq b \; \text{ and } \; U \supseteq V;$$
then $\left(x_a\right)_{(a, U) \in I} \to x \text{ in } X$ and $\left(x_a\right)_{(a, U) \in I}$ is a subnet of $x_{\bull} = \left(x_a\right)_{a \in A}$ since the map
$$\begin{alignat}{4}
\alpha :\;&& I      &&\;\to    \;& A \\[0.3ex]
&& (a, U) &&\;\mapsto\;& a \\
\end{alignat}$$
is a monotone function whose image $\alpha(I) = A$ is a cofinal subset of $A,$ and $x_{\alpha(\bull)} := \left(x_{\alpha(i)}\right)_{i \in I} = \left(x_{\alpha(a, U)}\right)_{(a, U) \in I} = \left(x_a\right)_{(a, U) \in I}.$

Thus, a point $x \in X$ is a cluster point of a given net if and only if it has a subnet that converges to $x.$

== See also ==
- Filter on a set – Family of subsets representing "large" sets
- Filters in topology#Subnets – Use of filters to describe and characterize all basic topological notions and results
