= Knaster's condition =

In mathematics, a partially ordered set P is said to have Knaster's condition upwards (sometimes property (K)) if any uncountable subset A of P has an upwards-linked uncountable subset. An analogous definition applies to Knaster's condition downwards.

The property is named after Polish mathematician Bronisław Knaster.

Knaster's condition implies the countable chain condition (ccc), and it is sometimes used in conjunction with a weaker form of Martin's axiom, where the ccc requirement is replaced with Knaster's condition. Not unlike ccc, Knaster's condition is also sometimes used as a property of a topological space, in which case it means that the topology (as in, the family of all open sets) with inclusion satisfies the condition.

Furthermore, assuming MA($\omega_1$), ccc implies Knaster's condition, making the two equivalent.
