= Centered set =

Order theory

In mathematics, in the area of order theory, an upwards centered set S is a subset of a partially ordered set, P, such that any finite subset of S has an upper bound in P. Similarly, any finite subset of a downwards centered set has a lower bound. An upwards centered set can also be called a consistent set. Any directed set is necessarily centered, and any centered set is a linked set.

A subset B of a partial order is said to be σ-centered if it is a countable union of centered sets.
