= Maximal common divisor =

In abstract algebra, particularly ring theory, maximal common divisors are an abstraction of the number theory concept of greatest common divisor (GCD). This definition is slightly more general than GCDs, and may exist in rings in which GCDs do not. Halter-Koch (1998) provides the following definition.

$d\in H$ is a maximal common divisor of a subset, $B\subset H$ , if the following criteria are met:

1. $d|b$ for all $b\in B$
2. Suppose $c\in H$, $d|c$ and $c|b$ for all $b\in B$. Then $c \simeq d$.
