= Upper topology =

Topology on a partially ordered set

In mathematics, the upper topology on a partially ordered set X is the coarsest topology in which the closure of a singleton $\{a\}$ is the order section $a] = \{x \leq a\}$ for each $a\in X.$ If $\leq$ is a partial order, the upper topology is the least order consistent topology in which all open sets are up-sets. However, not all up-sets must necessarily be open sets. The lower topology induced by the preorder is defined similarly in terms of the down-sets. The preorder inducing the upper topology is its specialization preorder, but the specialization preorder of the lower topology is opposite to the inducing preorder.

The real upper topology is most naturally defined on the upper-extended real line $(-\infty, +\infty] = \R \cup \{+\infty\}$ by the system $\{(a, +\infty] : a \in \R \cup \{\pm\infty\}\}$ of open sets. Similarly, the real lower topology $\{[-\infty, a) : a \in \R \cup \{\pm\infty\}\}$ is naturally defined on the lower real line $[-\infty, +\infty) = \R \cup \{-\infty\}.$ A real function on a topological space is upper semi-continuous if and only if it is lower-continuous, i.e. is continuous with respect to the lower topology on the lower-extended line ${[-\infty, +\infty)}.$ Similarly, a function into the upper real line is lower semi-continuous if and only if it is upper-continuous, i.e. is continuous with respect to the upper topology on ${(-\infty, +\infty]}.$

== See also ==
- List of topologies – List of concrete topologies and topological spaces

== Bibliography ==
- Gerhard Gierz; K.H. Hofmann; K. Keimel; J. D. Lawson; M. Mislove; D. S. Scott (2003). Continuous Lattices and Domains. Cambridge University Press. p. 510. ISBN 0-521-80338-1.
- Kelley, John L. (1975) [1955]. General Topology. Graduate Texts in Mathematics. Vol. 27 (2nd ed.). New York: Springer-Verlag. ISBN 978-0-387-90125-1. OCLC 1365153. p.101
- Knapp, Anthony W. (2005). Basic Real Analysis. Birkhhauser. p. 481. ISBN 0-8176-3250-6.
