= Linked set =

Mathematical concept regarding posets in (partial) order theory

In mathematics, an upwards linked set A is a subset of a partially ordered set, P, in which any two of elements A have a common upper bound in P. Similarly, every pair of elements of a downwards linked set has a lower bound. Every centered set is linked, which includes, in particular, every directed set.
