= Cofinal (mathematics) =

Mathematical property of subsets in order theory

In mathematics, a subset $B \subseteq A$ of a preordered set $(A, \leq)$ is said to be cofinal or frequent in $A$ if for every $a \in A,$ it is possible to find an element $b$ in $B$ that dominates $a$ (formally, $a\leq b$).

Cofinal subsets are very important in the theory of directed sets and nets, where “cofinal subnet” is the appropriate generalization of "subsequence". They are also important in order theory, including the theory of cardinal numbers, where the minimum possible cardinality of a cofinal subset of $A$ is referred to as the cofinality of $A.$

== Definitions ==
Let $\,\leq\,$ be a homogeneous binary relation on a set $A.$ A subset $B \subseteq A$ is said to be cofinal or frequent with respect to $\,\leq\,$ if it satisfies the following condition:

For every $a \in A,$ there exists some $b \in B$ that $a \leq b.$

A subset that is not frequent is called infrequent. This definition is most commonly applied when $(A, \leq)$ is a directed set, which is a preordered set with additional properties.

Final functions

A map $f : X \to A$ between two directed sets is said to be final if the image $f(X)$ of $f$ is a cofinal subset of $A.$

Coinitial subsets

A subset $B \subseteq A$ is said to be coinitial (or dense in the sense of forcing) if it satisfies the following condition:

For every $a \in A,$ there exists some $b \in B$ such that $b \leq a.$

This is the order-theoretic dual to the notion of cofinal subset. Cofinal (respectively coinitial) subsets are precisely the dense sets with respect to the right (respectively left) order topology.

== Properties ==
The cofinal relation over partially ordered sets ("posets") is reflexive: every poset is cofinal in itself. It is also transitive: if $B$ is a cofinal subset of a poset $A,$ and $C$ is a cofinal subset of $B$ (with the partial ordering of $A$ applied to $B$), then $C$ is also a cofinal subset of $A.$

For a partially ordered set with maximal elements, every cofinal subset must contain all maximal elements, otherwise a maximal element that is not in the subset would fail to be less than or equal to any element of the subset, violating the definition of cofinal. For a partially ordered set with a greatest element, a subset is cofinal if and only if it contains that greatest element (this follows, since a greatest element is necessarily a maximal element). Partially ordered sets without greatest element or maximal elements admit disjoint cofinal subsets. For example, the even and odd natural numbers form disjoint cofinal subsets of the set of all natural numbers.

If a partially ordered set $A$ admits a totally ordered cofinal subset, then we can find a subset $B$ that is well-ordered and cofinal in $A.$

If $(A, \leq)$ is a directed set and if $B \subseteq A$ is a cofinal subset of $A$ then $(B, \leq)$ is also a directed set.

== Examples and sufficient conditions ==
Any superset of a cofinal subset is itself cofinal.

If $(A, \leq)$ is a directed set and if some union of (one or more) finitely many subsets $S_1 \cup \cdots \cup S_n$ is cofinal then at least one of the set $S_1, \ldots, S_n$ is cofinal. This property is not true in general without the hypothesis that $(A, \leq)$ is directed.

Subset relations and neighborhood bases

Let $X$ be a topological space and let $\mathcal{N}_x$ denote the neighborhood filter at a point $x \in X.$ The superset relation $\,\supseteq\,$ is a partial order on $\mathcal{N}_x$: explicitly, for any sets $S$ and $T,$ declare that $S \leq T$ if and only if $S \supseteq T$ (so in essence, $\,\leq\,$ is equal to $\,\supseteq\,$). A subset $\mathcal{B} \subseteq \mathcal{N}_x$ is called a neighborhood base at $x$ if (and only if) $\mathcal{B}$ is a cofinal subset of $\left(\mathcal{N}_x, \supseteq\right);$ that is, if and only if for every $N \in \mathcal{N}_x$ there exists some $B \in \mathcal{B}$ such that $N \supseteq B.$ (I.e. such that $N \leq B$.)

Cofinal subsets of the real numbers

For any $- \infty < x < \infty,$ the interval $(x, \infty)$ is a cofinal subset of $(\R, \leq)$ but it is not a cofinal subset of $(\R, \geq).$ The set $\N$ of natural numbers (consisting of positive integers) is a cofinal subset of $(\R, \leq)$ but this is not true of the set of negative integers $- \N := \{ -1, -2, -3, \ldots \}.$

Similarly, for any $-\infty < y < \infty,$ the interval $(- \infty, y)$ is a cofinal subset of $(\R, \geq)$ but it is not a cofinal subset of $(\R, \leq).$ The set $- \N$ of negative integers is a cofinal subset of $(\R, \geq)$ but this is not true of the natural numbers $\N.$ The set $\Z$ of all integers is a cofinal subset of $(\R, \leq)$ and also a cofinal subset of $(\R, \geq)$; the same is true of the set $\Q.$

== Cofinal set of subsets ==
A particular but important case is given if $A$ is a subset of the power set $\wp(E)$ of some set $E,$ ordered by reverse inclusion $\,\supseteq.$ Given this ordering of $A,$ a subset $B \subseteq A$ is cofinal in $A$ if for every $a \in A$ there is a $b \in B$ such that $a \supseteq b.$

For example, let $E$ be a group and let $A$ be the set of normal subgroups of finite index. The profinite completion of $E$ is defined to be the inverse limit of the inverse system of finite quotients of $E$ (which are parametrized by the set $A$). In this situation, every cofinal subset of $A$ is sufficient to construct and describe the profinite completion of $E.$

== See also ==
- Cofinite – Subset with finite complement
- Cofinality – Size of subsets in order theory
- Upper set – Subset of a preorder that contains all larger elements
  - a subset $U$ of a partially ordered set $(P, \leq)$ that contains every element $y \in P$ for which there is an $x \in U$ with $x \leq y$
