= Net (mathematics) =

Generalization of a sequence of points

In mathematics, more specifically in general topology and related branches, a net or Moore–Smith sequence is a function whose domain is a directed set. The codomain of this function is usually some topological space. Nets directly generalize the concept of a sequence in a metric space. Nets are primarily used in the fields of analysis and topology, where they are used to characterize many important topological properties that (in general) sequences are unable to characterize (this shortcoming of sequences motivated the study of sequential spaces and Fréchet–Urysohn spaces). Nets are in one-to-one correspondence with filters.

== History ==
The concept of a net was first introduced by E. H. Moore and Herman L. Smith in 1922. The term "net" was coined by John L. Kelley.

The related concept of a filter was developed in 1937 by Henri Cartan.

== Definitions ==
A directed set is a non-empty set $A$ together with a preorder, typically automatically assumed to be denoted by $\,\leq\,$ (unless indicated otherwise), with the property that it is also (upward) directed, which means that for any $a, b \in A,$ there exists some $c \in A$ such that $a \leq c$ and $b \leq c.$ In words, this property means that given any two elements (of $A$), there is always some element that is "above" both of them (greater than or equal to each); in this way, directed sets generalize the notion of "a direction" in a mathematically rigorous way. Importantly though, directed sets are not required to be total orders or even partial orders. A directed set may have a greatest element. In this case, the conditions $a \leq c$ and $b \leq c$ cannot be replaced by the strict inequalities $a < c$ and $b < c$, since the strict inequalities cannot be satisfied if a or b is a greatest element.

A net in $X$, denoted $x_\bull = \left(x_a\right)_{a \in A}$, is a function of the form $x_\bull : A \to X$ whose domain $A$ is some directed set, and whose values are $x_\bullet(a)= x_a$. Elements of a net's domain are called its indices. When the set $X$ is clear from context it is simply called a net, and one assumes $A$ is a directed set with preorder $\,\leq.$ Notation for nets varies, for example using angled brackets $\left\langle x_a \right\rangle_{a \in A}$. As is common in algebraic topology notation, the filled disk or "bullet" stands in place of the input variable or index $a \in A$.

=== Limits of nets ===
A net $x_\bull = \left(x_a\right)_{a \in A}$ is said to be eventually or residually in a set $S$ if there exists some $a \in A$ such that for every $b \in A$ with $b \geq a,$ the point $x_b \in S.$ A point $x \in X$ is called a limit point or limit of the net $x_\bull$ in $X$ whenever:

for every open neighborhood $U$ of $x,$ the net $x_\bull$ is eventually in $U$,

expressed equivalently as: the net converges to/towards $x$ or has $x$ as a limit; and variously denoted as:
$$\begin{alignat}{4}
& x_\bull && \to\; && x && \;\;\text{ in } X \\
& x_a     && \to\; && x && \;\;\text{ in } X \\
\lim        \; & x_\bull && \to\; && x && \;\;\text{ in } X \\
\lim_{a \in A} \; & x_a     && \to\; && x && \;\;\text{ in } X \\
\lim_a   \; & x_a     && \to\; && x && \;\;\text{ in } X.
\end{alignat}$$
If $X$ is clear from context, it may be omitted from the notation.

If $\lim x_\bull \to x$ and this limit is unique (i.e. $\lim x_\bull \to y$ only for $x = y$) then one writes:
$$\lim x_\bull = x \;~~ \text{ or } ~~\; \lim x_a = x \;~~ \text{ or } ~~\; \lim_{a \in A} x_a = x$$
using the equal sign in place of the arrow $\to.$ In a Hausdorff space, the limit of a convergent net is unique. Some authors do not distinguish between the notations $\lim x_\bull = x$ and $\lim x_\bull \to x$, but this can lead to ambiguities if the ambient space $X$ is not Hausdorff.

=== Cluster points of nets ===
A net $x_\bull = \left(x_a\right)_{a \in A}$ is said to be frequently or cofinally in $S$ if for every $a \in A$ there exists some $b \in A$ such that $b \geq a$ and $x_b \in S.$ A point $x \in X$ is said to be an accumulation point or cluster point of a net if for every neighborhood $U$ of $x,$ the net is frequently/cofinally in $U.$ In fact, $x \in X$ is a cluster point if and only if it has a subnet that converges to $x.$ The set $\operatorname{cl}_X \left( x_{\bullet} \right)$ of all cluster points of $x_\bull$ in $X$ is equal to $\operatorname{cl}_X \left(x_{\geq a} \right)$ for each $a\in A$, where $x_{\geq a} := \left\{x_b : b \geq a, b \in A\right\}$.

=== Subnets ===
The analogue of "subsequence" for nets is the notion of a "subnet". There are several different non-equivalent definitions of "subnet" and this article will use the definition introduced in 1970 by Stephen Willard, which is as follows: If $x_\bull = \left(x_a\right)_{a \in A}$ and $s_\bull = \left(s_i\right)_{i \in I}$ are nets then $s_\bull$ is called a subnet or Willard-subnet of $x_\bull$ if there exists an order-preserving map $h : I \to A$ such that $h(I)$ is a cofinal subset of $A$ and
$$s_i = x_{h(i)} \quad \text{ for all } i \in I.$$
The map $h : I \to A$ is called order-preserving and an order homomorphism if whenever $i \leq j$ then $h(i) \leq h(j).$ The set $h(I)$ being cofinal in $A$ means that for every $a \in A,$ there exists some $b \in h(I)$ such that $b \geq a.$

If $x \in X$ is a cluster point of some subnet of $x_\bull$ then $x$ is also a cluster point of $x_\bull.$

=== Ultranets ===
A net $x_\bull$ in set $X$ is called a universal net or an ultranet if for every subset $S \subseteq X,$ $x_\bull$ is eventually in $S$ or $x_\bull$ is eventually in the complement $X \setminus S.$

Every constant net is a (trivial) ultranet. Every subnet of an ultranet is an ultranet. Assuming the axiom of choice, every net has some subnet that is an ultranet, but no nontrivial ultranets have ever been constructed explicitly. If $x_\bull = \left(x_a\right)_{a \in A}$ is an ultranet in $X$ and $f : X \to Y$ is a function then $f \circ x_\bull = \left(f\left(x_a\right)\right)_{a \in A}$ is an ultranet in $Y.$

Given $x \in X,$ an ultranet clusters at $x$ if and only if it converges to $x.$

=== Cauchy nets ===
A Cauchy net generalizes the notion of Cauchy sequence to nets defined on uniform spaces.

A net $x_\bull = \left(x_a\right)_{a \in A}$ is a Cauchy net if for every entourage $V$ there exists $c \in A$ such that for all $a, b \geq c,$ $\left(x_a, x_b\right)$ is a member of $V.$ More generally, in a Cauchy space, a net $x_\bull$ is Cauchy if the filter generated by the net is a Cauchy filter.

A topological vector space (TVS) is called complete if every Cauchy net converges to some point. A normed space, which is a special type of topological vector space, is a complete TVS (equivalently, a Banach space) if and only if every Cauchy sequence converges to some point (a property that is called sequential completeness). Although Cauchy nets are not needed to describe completeness of normed spaces, they are needed to describe completeness of more general (possibly non-normable) topological vector spaces.

== Characterizations of topological properties ==
Virtually all concepts of topology can be rephrased in the language of nets and limits. This may be useful to guide the intuition since the notion of limit of a net is very similar to that of limit of a sequence. The following set of theorems and lemmas help cement that similarity:

=== Closed sets and closure ===
A subset $S \subseteq X$ is closed in $X$ if and only if every limit point in $X$ of a net in $S$ necessarily lies in $S$. Explicitly, this means that if $s_\bull = \left(s_a\right)_{a \in A}$ is a net with $s_a\in S$ for all $a\in A$, and $\lim{}_{} s_\bull \to x$ in $X,$ then $x \in S.$

More generally, if $S \subseteq X$ is any subset, the closure of $S$ is the set of points $x\in X$ with $\lim_{a\in A} s_\bullet \to x$ for some net $\left(s_a\right)_{a \in A}$ in $S$.

=== Open sets and characterizations of topologies ===
A subset $S \subseteq X$ is open if and only if no net in $X \setminus S$ converges to a point of $S.$ Also, a subset $S \subseteq X$ is open if and only if every net converging to an element of $S$ is eventually contained in $S.$ It is these characterizations of "open subset" that allow nets to characterize topologies. Topologies can also be characterized by closed subsets since a set is open if and only if its complement is closed. So the characterizations of "closed set" in terms of nets can also be used to characterize topologies.

=== Continuity ===
A function $f : X \to Y$ between topological spaces is continuous at a point $x$ if and only if for every net $x_\bull = \left(x_a\right)_{a \in A}$ in the domain, $\lim_{} x_\bull \to x$ in $X$ implies $\lim{} f\left(x_\bull\right) \to f(x)$ in $Y.$ Briefly, a function $f : X \to Y$ is continuous if and only if $x_\bull \to x$ in $X$ implies $f\left(x_\bull\right) \to f(x)$ in $Y.$ In general, this statement would not be true if the word "net" was replaced by "sequence"; that is, it is necessary to allow for directed sets other than just the natural numbers if $X$ is not a first-countable space (or not a sequential space).

Proof

($\implies$) Let $f$ be continuous at point $x,$ and let $x_\bull = \left(x_a\right)_{a \in A}$ be a net such that $\lim_{} x_\bull \to x.$ Then for every open neighborhood $U$ of $f(x),$ its preimage under $f,$ $V := f^{-1}(U),$ is a neighborhood of $x$ (by the continuity of $f$ at $x$). Thus the interior of $V,$ which is denoted by $\operatorname{int} V,$ is an open neighborhood of $x,$ and consequently $x_\bull$ is eventually in $\operatorname{int} V.$ Therefore $\left(f\left(x_a\right)\right)_{a \in A}$ is eventually in $f(\operatorname{int} V)$ and thus also eventually in $f(V)$ which is a subset of $U.$ Thus $\lim_{} \left(f\left(x_a\right)\right)_{a \in A} \to f(x),$ and this direction is proven.

($\Longleftarrow$) Let $x$ be a point such that for every net $x_\bull = \left(x_a\right)_{a \in A}$ such that $\lim_{} x_\bull \to x,$ $\lim_{} \left(f\left(x_a\right)\right)_{a \in A} \to f(x).$ Now suppose that $f$ is not continuous at $x.$ Then there is a neighborhood $U$ of $f(x)$ whose preimage under $f,$ $V,$ is not a neighborhood of $x.$ Because $f(x) \in U,$ necessarily $x \in V.$ Now the set of open neighborhoods of $x$ with the containment preorder is a directed set (since the intersection of every two such neighborhoods is an open neighborhood of $x$ as well).

We construct a net $x_\bull = \left(x_a\right)_{a \in A}$ such that for every open neighborhood of $x$ whose index is $a,$ $x_a$ is a point in this neighborhood that is not in $V$; that there is always such a point follows from the fact that no open neighborhood of $x$ is included in $V$ (because by assumption, $V$ is not a neighborhood of $x$). It follows that $f\left(x_a\right)$ is not in $U.$

Now, for every open neighborhood $W$ of $x,$ this neighborhood is a member of the directed set whose index we denote $a_0.$ For every $b \geq a_0,$ the member of the directed set whose index is $b$ is contained within $W$; therefore $x_b \in W.$ Thus $\lim_{} x_\bull \to x.$ and by our assumption $\lim_{} \left(f\left(x_a\right)\right)_{a \in A} \to f(x).$ But $\operatorname{int} U$ is an open neighborhood of $f(x)$ and thus $f\left(x_a\right)$ is eventually in $\operatorname{int} U$ and therefore also in $U,$ in contradiction to $f\left(x_a\right)$ not being in $U$ for every $a.$ This is a contradiction so $f$ must be continuous at $x.$ This completes the proof.

=== Compactness ===
A space $X$ is compact if and only if every net $x_\bull = \left(x_a\right)_{a \in A}$ in $X$ has a subnet with a limit in $X.$ This can be seen as a generalization of the Bolzano–Weierstrass theorem and Heine–Borel theorem.

Proof

($\implies$) First, suppose that $X$ is compact. We will need the following observation (see finite intersection property). Let $I$ be any non-empty set and $\left\{C_i\right\}_{i \in I}$ be a collection of closed subsets of $X$ such that $\bigcap_{i \in J} C_i \neq \varnothing$ for each finite $J \subseteq I.$ Then $\bigcap_{i \in I} C_i \neq \varnothing$ as well. Otherwise, $\left\{C_i^c\right\}_{i \in I}$ would be an open cover for $X$ with no finite subcover contrary to the compactness of $X.$

Let $x_\bull = \left(x_a\right)_{a \in A}$ be a net in $X$ directed by $A.$ For every $a \in A$ define
$$E_a \triangleq \left\{x_b : b \geq a\right\}.$$
The collection $\{\operatorname{cl}\left(E_a\right) : a \in A\}$ has the property that every finite subcollection has non-empty intersection. Thus, by the remark above, we have that
$$\bigcap_{a \in A} \operatorname{cl} E_a \neq \varnothing$$
and this is precisely the set of cluster points of $x_\bull.$ By the proof given in the next section, it is equal to the set of limits of convergent subnets of $x_\bull.$ Thus $x_\bull$ has a convergent subnet.

($\Longleftarrow$) Conversely, suppose that every net in $X$ has a convergent subnet. For the sake of contradiction, let $\left\{U_i : i \in I\right\}$ be an open cover of $X$ with no finite subcover. Consider $D \triangleq \{J \subset I : |J| < \infty\}.$ Observe that $D$ is a directed set under inclusion and for each $C\in D,$ there exists an $x_C \in X$ such that $x_C \notin U_a$ for all $a \in C.$ Consider the net $\left(x_C\right)_{C \in D}.$ This net cannot have a convergent subnet, because for each $x \in X$ there exists $c \in I$ such that $U_c$ is a neighbourhood of $x$; however, for all $B \supseteq \{c\},$ we have that $x_B \notin U_c.$ This is a contradiction and completes the proof.

=== Cluster and limit points ===
The set of cluster points of a net is equal to the set of limits of its convergent subnets.

Proof

Let $x_\bull = \left(x_a\right)_{a \in A}$ be a net in a topological space $X$ (where as usual $A$ automatically assumed to be a directed set) and also let $y \in X.$ If $y$ is a limit of a subnet of $x_\bull$ then $y$ is a cluster point of $x_\bull.$

Conversely, assume that $y$ is a cluster point of $x_\bull.$ Let $B$ be the set of pairs $(U, a)$ where $U$ is an open neighborhood of $y$ in $X$ and $a \in A$ is such that $x_a \in U.$ The map $h : B \to A$ mapping $(U, a)$ to $a$ is then cofinal. Moreover, giving $B$ the product order (the neighborhoods of $y$ are ordered by inclusion) makes it a directed set, and the net $\left(y_b\right)_{b \in B}$ defined by $y_b = x_{h(b)}$ converges to $y.$

A net has a limit if and only if all of its subnets have limits. In that case, every limit of the net is also a limit of every subnet.

=== Other properties ===
In general, a net in a space $X$ can have more than one limit, but if $X$ is a Hausdorff space, the limit of a net, if it exists, is unique. Conversely, if $X$ is not Hausdorff, then there exists a net on $X$ with two distinct limits. Thus the uniqueness of the limit is equivalent to the Hausdorff condition on the space, and indeed this may be taken as the definition. This result depends on the directedness condition; a set indexed by a general preorder or partial order may have distinct limit points even in a Hausdorff space.

== Relation to filters ==
A filter is a related idea in topology that allows for a general definition for convergence in general topological spaces. The two ideas are equivalent in the sense that they give the same concept of convergence. More specifically, every filter base induces an associated net using the filter's pointed sets, and convergence of the filter base implies convergence of the associated net. Similarly, any net $\left(x_a\right)_{a \in A}$ in $X$ induces a filter base of tails $\left\{\left\{x_a : a \in A, a_0 \leq a\right\} : a_0 \in A\right\}$ where the filter in $X$ generated by this filter base is called the net's eventuality filter. Convergence of the net implies convergence of the eventuality filter. This correspondence allows for any theorem that can be proven with one concept to be proven with the other. For instance, continuity of a function from one topological space to the other can be characterized either by the convergence of a net in the domain implying the convergence of the corresponding net in the codomain, or by the same statement with filter bases.

Robert G. Bartle argues that despite their equivalence, it is useful to have both concepts. He argues that nets are enough like sequences to make natural proofs and definitions in analogy to sequences, especially ones using sequential elements, such as is common in analysis, while filters are most useful in algebraic topology. In any case, he shows how the two can be used in combination to prove various theorems in general topology.

The learning curve for using nets is typically much less steep than that for filters, which is why many mathematicians, especially analysts, prefer them over filters. However, filters, and especially ultrafilters, have some important technical advantages over nets that ultimately result in nets being encountered much less often than filters outside of the fields of analysis and topology.

== As generalization of sequences ==
Every non-empty totally ordered set is directed. Therefore, every function on such a set is a net. In particular, the natural numbers $\N$ together with the usual integer comparison $\,\leq\,$ preorder form the canonical example of a directed set. A sequence is a function on the natural numbers, so every sequence $a_1, a_2, \ldots$ in a topological space $X$ can be considered a net in $X$ defined on $\N.$ Conversely, any net whose domain is the natural numbers is a sequence because by definition, a sequence in $X$ is just a function from $\N = \{1, 2, \ldots\}$ into $X.$ It is in this way that nets are generalizations of sequences: rather than being defined on a countable linearly ordered set ($\N$), a net is defined on an arbitrary directed set. Nets are frequently denoted using notation that is similar to (and inspired by) that used with sequences. For example, the subscript notation $x_a$ is taken from sequences.

Similarly, every limit of a sequence and limit of a function can be interpreted as a limit of a net. Specifically, the net is eventually in a subset $S$ of $X$ if there exists an $N \in \N$ such that for every integer $n \geq N,$ the point $a_n$ is in $S.$ So $\lim {}_n a_n \to L$ if and only if for every neighborhood $V$ of $L,$ the net is eventually in $V.$ The net is frequently in a subset $S$ of $X$ if and only if for every $N \in \N$ there exists some integer $n \geq N$ such that $a_n \in S,$ that is, if and only if infinitely many elements of the sequence are in $S.$ Thus a point $y \in X$ is a cluster point of the net if and only if every neighborhood $V$ of $y$ contains infinitely many elements of the sequence.

In the context of topology, sequences do not fully encode all information about functions between topological spaces. In particular, the following two conditions are, in general, not equivalent for a map $f$ between topological spaces $X$ and $Y$:

1. The map $f$ is continuous in the topological sense;
2. Given any point $x$ in $X,$ and any sequence in $X$ converging to $x,$ the composition of $f$ with this sequence converges to $f(x)$ (continuous in the sequential sense).

While condition 1 always guarantees condition 2, the converse is not necessarily true. The spaces for which the two conditions are equivalent are called sequential spaces. All first-countable spaces, including metric spaces, are sequential spaces, but not all topological spaces are sequential. Nets generalize the notion of a sequence so that condition 2 reads as follows:

2. Given any point $x$ in $X,$ and any net in $X$ converging to $x,$ the composition of $f$ with this net converges to $f(x)$ (continuous in the net sense).

With this change, the conditions become equivalent for all maps of topological spaces, including topological spaces that do not necessarily have a countable or linearly ordered neighbourhood basis around a point. Therefore, while sequences do not encode sufficient information about functions between topological spaces, nets do, because collections of open sets in topological spaces are much like directed sets in behavior.

For an example where sequences do not suffice, interpret the set $\Reals^\Reals$ of all functions with prototype $f : \Reals \to \Reals$ as the Cartesian product ${\textstyle\prod\limits_{x \in \Reals}} \Reals$ (by identifying a function $f$ with the tuple $(f(x))_{x \in \Reals},$ and conversely) and endow it with the product topology. This (product) topology on $\Reals^\Reals$ is identical to the topology of pointwise convergence. Let $E$ denote the set of all functions $f : \Reals \to \{0, 1\}$ that are equal to $1$ everywhere except for at most finitely many points (that is, such that the set $\{x : f(x) = 0\}$ is finite). Then the constant $0$ function $\mathbf{0} : \Reals \to \{0\}$ belongs to the closure of $E$ in $\Reals^\Reals;$ that is, $\mathbf{0} \in \operatorname{cl}_{\Reals^\Reals} E.$ This will be proven by constructing a net in $E$ that converges to $\mathbf{0}.$ However, there does not exist any sequence in $E$ that converges to $\mathbf{0},$ which makes this one instance where (non-sequence) nets must be used because sequences alone can not reach the desired conclusion. Compare elements of $\Reals^\Reals$ pointwise in the usual way by declaring that $f \geq g$ if and only if $f(x) \geq g(x)$ for all $x.$ This pointwise comparison is a partial order that makes $(E, \geq)$ a directed set since given any $f, g \in E,$ their pointwise minimum $m := \min \{f, g\}$ belongs to $E$ and satisfies $f \geq m$ and $g \geq m.$ This partial order turns the identity map $\operatorname{Id} : (E, \geq) \to E$ (defined by $f \mapsto f$) into an $E$-valued net. This net converges pointwise to $\mathbf{0}$ in $\Reals^\Reals,$ which implies that $\mathbf{0}$ belongs to the closure of $E$ in $\Reals^\Reals.$

More generally, a subnet of a sequence is not necessarily a sequence. (Note: For an example, let $X = \Reals^n$ and let $x_i = 0$ for every $i \in \N,$ so that $x_\bull = (0)_{i \in \N} : \N \to X$ is the constant zero sequence. Let $I = \{r \in \Reals : r > 0\}$ be directed by the usual order $\,\leq\,$ and let $s_r = 0$ for each $r \in R.$ Define $\varphi : I \to \N$ by letting $\varphi(r) = \lceil r \rceil$ be the ceiling of $r.$ The map $\varphi : I \to \N$ is an order morphism whose image is cofinal in its codomain and $\left(x_\bull \circ \varphi\right)(r) = x_{\varphi(r)} = 0 = s_r$ holds for every $r \in R.$ This shows that $\left(s_{r}\right)_{r \in R} = x_\bull \circ \varphi$ is a subnet of the sequence $x_\bull$ (where this subnet is not a subsequence of $x_\bull$ because it is not even a sequence since its domain is an uncountable set).) Moreso, a subnet of a sequence may be a sequence, but not a subsequence. (Note: The sequence $\left(s_i\right)_{i \in \N} := (1, 1, 2, 2, 3, 3, \ldots)$ is not a subsequence of $\left(x_i\right)_{i \in \N} := (1, 2, 3, \ldots)$, although it is a subnet, because the map $h : \N \to \N$ defined by $h(i) := \left\lfloor \tfrac{i + 1}{2} \right\rfloor$ is an order-preserving map whose image is $h(\N) = \N$ and satisfies $s_i = x_{h(i)}$ for all $i \in \N.$ Indeed, this is because $x_i = i$ and $s_i = h(i)$ for every $i \in \N;$ in other words, when considered as functions on $\N,$ the sequence $x_{\bull}$ is just the identity map on $\N$ while $s_{\bull} = h.$) But, in the specific case of a sequential space, every net induces a corresponding sequence, and this relationship maps subnets to subsequences. Specifically, for a first-countable space, the net $\left(x_a\right)_{a \in A}$ induces the sequence $\left(x_{h_n}\right)_{n \in \N}$ where $h_n$ is defined as the $n^{\text{th}}$ smallest value in $A$ – that is, let $h_1 := \inf A$ and let $h_n := \inf \{a \in A : a > h_{n-1}\}$ for every integer $n > 1$.

== Examples ==
=== Subspace topology ===
If the set $S = \{x\} \cup \left\{x_a : a \in A\right\}$ is endowed with the subspace topology induced on it by $X,$ then $\lim_{} x_\bull \to x$ in $X$ if and only if $\lim_{} x_\bull \to x$ in $S.$ In this way, the question of whether or not the net $x_\bull$ converges to the given point $x$ depends solely on this topological subspace $S$ consisting of $x$ and the image of (that is, the points of) the net $x_\bull.$

=== Neighborhood systems ===
Intuitively, convergence of a net $\left(x_a\right)_{a \in A}$ means that the values $x_a$ come and stay as close as we want to $x$ for large enough $a.$ Given a point $x$ in a topological space, let $N_x$ denote the set of all neighbourhoods containing $x.$ Then $N_x$ is a directed set, where the direction is given by reverse inclusion, so that $S \geq T$ if and only if $S$ is contained in $T.$ For $S \in N_x,$ let $x_S$ be a point in $S.$ Then $\left(x_S\right)$ is a net. As $S$ increases with respect to $\,\geq,$ the points $x_S$ in the net are constrained to lie in decreasing neighbourhoods of $x.$ Therefore, in this neighborhood system of a point $x$, $x_S$ does indeed converge to $x$ according to the definition of net convergence.

Given a subbase $\mathcal{B}$ for the topology on $X$ (where note that every base for a topology is also a subbase) and given a point $x \in X,$ a net $x_\bull$ in $X$ converges to $x$ if and only if it is eventually in every neighborhood $U \in \mathcal{B}$ of $x.$ This characterization extends to neighborhood subbases (and so also neighborhood bases) of the given point $x.$

=== Limits in a Cartesian product ===
A net in the product space has a limit if and only if each projection has a limit.

Explicitly, let $\left(X_i\right)_{i \in I}$ be topological spaces, endow their Cartesian product
$${\textstyle\prod} X_\bull := \prod_{i \in I} X_i$$
with the product topology, and that for every index $l \in I,$ denote the canonical projection to $X_l$ by
$$\begin{alignat}{4}
\pi_l :\;&& {\textstyle\prod} X_\bull  &&\;\to\;& X_l \\[0.3ex]
&& \left(x_i\right)_{i \in I} &&\;\mapsto\;& x_l \\
\end{alignat}$$

Let $f_\bull = \left(f_a\right)_{a \in A}$ be a net in ${\textstyle\prod} X_\bull$ directed by $A$ and for every index $i \in I,$ let
$$\pi_i\left(f_\bull\right) ~\stackrel{\scriptscriptstyle\text{def}}{=}~ \left(\pi_i\left(f_a\right)\right)_{a \in A}$$
denote the result of "plugging $f_\bull$ into $\pi_i$", which results in the net $\pi_i\left(f_\bull\right) : A \to X_i.$ It is sometimes useful to think of this definition in terms of function composition: the net $\pi_i\left(f_\bull\right)$ is equal to the composition of the net $f_\bull : A \to {\textstyle\prod} X_\bull$ with the projection $\pi_i : {\textstyle\prod} X_\bull \to X_i;$ that is, $\pi_i\left(f_\bull\right) ~\stackrel{\scriptscriptstyle\text{def}}{=}~ \pi_i \,\circ\, f_\bull.$

For any given point $L = \left(L_i\right)_{i \in I} \in {\textstyle\prod\limits_{i \in I}} X_i,$ the net $f_\bull$ converges to $L$ in the product space ${\textstyle\prod} X_\bull$ if and only if for every index $i \in I,$ $\pi_i\left(f_\bull\right) \;\stackrel{\scriptscriptstyle\text{def}}{=}\; \left(\pi_i\left(f_a\right)\right)_{a \in A}$ converges to $L_i$ in $X_i.$ And whenever the net $f_\bull$ clusters at $L$ in ${\textstyle\prod} X_\bull$ then $\pi_i\left(f_\bull\right)$ clusters at $L_i$ for every index $i \in I.$ However, the converse does not hold in general. For example, suppose $X_1 = X_2 = \Reals$ and let $f_\bull = \left(f_a\right)_{a \in \N}$ denote the sequence $(1, 1), (0, 0), (1, 1), (0, 0), \ldots$ that alternates between $(1, 1)$ and $(0, 0).$ Then $L_1 := 0$ and $L_2 := 1$ are cluster points of both $\pi_1\left(f_\bull\right)$ and $\pi_2\left(f_\bull\right)$ in $X_1 \times X_2 = \Reals^2$ but $\left(L_1, L_2\right) = (0, 1)$ is not a cluster point of $f_\bull$ since the open ball of radius $1$ centered at $(0, 1)$ does not contain even a single point $f_\bull$

=== Tychonoff's theorem and relation to the axiom of choice ===
If no $L \in X$ is given but for every $i \in I,$ there exists some $L_i \in X_i$ such that $\pi_i\left(f_\bull\right) \to L_i$ in $X_i$ then the tuple defined by $L = \left(L_i\right)_{i \in I}$ will be a limit of $f_\bull$ in $X.$ However, the axiom of choice might need to be assumed to conclude that this tuple $L$ exists; the axiom of choice is not needed in some situations, such as when $I$ is finite or when every $L_i \in X_i$ is the unique limit of the net $\pi_i\left(f_\bull\right)$ (because then there is nothing to choose between), which happens for example, when every $X_i$ is a Hausdorff space. If $I$ is infinite and ${\textstyle\prod} X_\bull = {\textstyle\prod\limits_{j \in I}} X_j$ is not empty, then the axiom of choice would (in general) still be needed to conclude that the projections $\pi_i : {\textstyle\prod} X_\bull \to X_i$ are surjective maps.

The axiom of choice is equivalent to Tychonoff's theorem, which states that the product of any collection of compact topological spaces is compact. But if every compact space is also Hausdorff, then the so called "Tychonoff's theorem for compact Hausdorff spaces" can be used instead, which is equivalent to the ultrafilter lemma and so strictly weaker than the axiom of choice. Nets can be used to give short proofs of both version of Tychonoff's theorem by using the characterization of net convergence given above together with the fact that a space is compact if and only if every net has a convergent subnet.

=== Limit superior/inferior ===
Limit superior and limit inferior of a net of real numbers can be defined in a similar manner as for sequences. Some authors work even with more general structures than the real line, like complete lattices.

For a net $\left(x_a\right)_{a \in A},$ put
$$\limsup x_a = \lim_{a \in A} \sup_{b \succeq a} x_b = \inf_{a \in A} \sup_{b \succeq a} x_b.$$

Limit superior of a net of real numbers has many properties analogous to the case of sequences. For example,
$$\limsup (x_a + y_a) \leq \limsup x_a + \limsup y_a,$$
where equality holds whenever one of the nets is convergent.

=== Riemann integral ===
The definition of the value of a Riemann integral can be interpreted as a limit of a net of Riemann sums where the net's directed set is the set of all partitions of the interval of integration, partially ordered by inclusion.

=== Metric spaces ===
Suppose $(M, d)$ is a metric space (or a pseudometric space) and $M$ is endowed with the metric topology. If $m \in M$ is a point and $m_\bull = \left(m_i\right)_{a \in A}$ is a net, then $m_\bull \to m$ in $(M, d)$ if and only if $d\left(m, m_\bull\right) \to 0$ in $\R,$ where $d\left(m, m_\bull\right) := \left(d\left(m, m_a\right)\right)_{a \in A}$ is a net of real numbers. In plain English, this characterization says that a net converges to a point in a metric space if and only if the distance between the net and the point converges to zero. If $(M, \|\cdot\|)$ is a normed space (or a seminormed space) then $m_\bull \to m$ in $(M, \|\cdot\|)$ if and only if $\left\|m - m_\bull\right\| \to 0$ in $\Reals,$ where $\left\|m - m_\bull\right\| := \left(\left\|m - m_a\right\|\right)_{a \in A}.$

If $(M, d)$ has at least two points, then we can fix a point $c \in M$ (such as $M := \R^n$ with the Euclidean metric with $c := 0$ being the origin, for example) and direct the set $I := M \setminus \{c\}$ reversely according to distance from $c$ by declaring that $i \leq j$ if and only if $d(j, c) \leq d(i, c).$ In other words, the relation is "has at least the same distance to $c$ as", so that "large enough" with respect to this relation means "close enough to $c$". Given any function with domain $M,$ its restriction to $I := M \setminus \{c\}$ can be canonically interpreted as a net directed by $(I, \leq).$

A net $f : M \setminus \{c\} \to X$ is eventually in a subset $S$ of a topological space $X$ if and only if there exists some $n \in M \setminus \{c\}$ such that for every $m \in M \setminus \{c\}$ satisfying $d(m, c) \leq d(n, c),$ the point $f(m)$ is in $S.$ Such a net $f$ converges in $X$ to a given point $L \in X$ if and only if $\lim_{m \to c} f(m) \to L$ in the usual sense (meaning that for every neighborhood $V$ of $L,$ $f$ is eventually in $V$).

The net $f : M \setminus \{c\} \to X$ is frequently in a subset $S$ of $X$ if and only if for every $n \in M \setminus \{c\}$ there exists some $m \in M \setminus \{c\}$ with $d(m, c) \leq d(n, c)$ such that $f(m)$ is in $S.$ Consequently, a point $L \in X$ is a cluster point of the net $f$ if and only if for every neighborhood $V$ of $L,$ the net is frequently in $V.$

=== Function from a well-ordered set to a topological space ===
Consider a well-ordered set $[0, c]$ with limit point $t$ and a function $f$ from $[0, t)$ to a topological space $X.$ This function is a net on $[0, t).$

It is eventually in a subset $V$ of $X$ if there exists an $r \in [0, t)$ such that for every $s \in [r, t)$ the point $f(s)$ is in $V.$

So $\lim_{x \to t} f(x) \to L$ if and only if for every neighborhood $V$ of $L,$ $f$ is eventually in $V.$

The net $f$ is frequently in a subset $V$ of $X$ if and only if for every $r \in [0, t)$ there exists some $s \in [r, t)$ such that $f(s) \in V.$

A point $y \in X$ is a cluster point of the net $f$ if and only if for every neighborhood $V$ of $y,$ the net is frequently in $V.$

The first example is a special case of this with $c = \omega.$

See also ordinal-indexed sequence.

== See also ==
- Characterizations of the category of topological spaces – Multiple equivalent ways to define a topological space
- Filter on a set – Family of subsets representing "large" sets
- Filters in topology – Application of set theory concept
- Preorder – Reflexive and transitive binary relation
- Sequential space – Topological space characterized by sequences
- Ultrafilter on a set – Maximal proper filter
