= Giga sport =

Giga sport or variation, may refer to:

- Gigasports, a Chinese sportswear retailer
- Gigasport, a sports equipment retailer owned by Kastner & Öhler
- GIGA Sport, a Polish monthly magazine founded by Tomasz Sommer

== See also ==
- Megasport (disambiguation)
- Hypersport (disambiguation)
- Super sport (disambiguation)
- Sport (disambiguation)
- Giga (disambiguation)
