= Super sport =

Supersport or super sport may refer to:

== Broadcasting ==
- SuperSport, a brand given to sports television channels operated or originally launched by MultiChoice in South Africa
  - SuperSport (South African broadcaster), a pan-African group of sports broadcast television channels mainly broadcast in Sub-Saharan Africa
  - C More Sport, a group of sports television channels broadcasting in Nordic countries (except Iceland), originally launched as SuperSport
  - Nova Sports, a group of Greek sports television channels formerly known as SuperSport
  - Ziggo Sport Totaal, a group of Dutch sports television channels formerly known as SuperSport
- Astro SuperSport, a Malaysian pay-TV channel
- Hub Sports Arena, a Singaporean television channel formerly known as SuperSports Arena
- SuperSport (Albanian TV network), a sports broadcasting package from Albania; airing on DigitAlb
- SUper Sports, a play-by-play sports broadcast produced by Syracuse University's CitrusTV

== Vehicles ==
- Alfa Romeo 6C 1500 Super Sport, a supercharged version of the 6C 1500
- Bugatti Veyron Super Sport, a rear mid-engined supercar
- Super Sport (Chevrolet), an option package offered by Chevrolet on some of its vehicles
- Chevrolet Corvette Super Sport, a show car based on a 1956 Corvette.
- Supersports, an Australian category of sports racing cars

=== Motorcycling ===
- Super sport (motorcycle), any sport bike, or more narrowly, a mid-sized sport bike
- Ducati SuperSport, an Italian sport bike
- Tunturi Super Sport, a Finnish motorcycle
- AMA Supersport Championship
- British Supersport Championship
- Supersport World Championship

== Other uses ==
- Schutzstaffel - ᛋᛋ Armanen runes logo referred to as 'Super Sport'
- BSA Supersport Air Rifle
- SuperSport Series, the main domestic first class cricket competition in South Africa
- Supersport United FC, a South African football club based in Pretoria
- SuperSports, a Thai retail store
- Zenith SupersPort, a line of laptop computers sold in the 1980s and 1990s by Zenith Data Systems

== See also ==
- Supercar (disambiguation), including super sports cars
- Hypersport (disambiguation)
- Megasport (disambiguation)
- Ultra sport (disambiguation)
- Super (disambiguation)
- Sport (disambiguation)
