= Ultra sport =

Ultra sport or ultrasport or variation, may refer to:

- Wills Wing Ultra Sport (aka UltraSport), a hang-glider
- SlipStream Ultra Sport, a U.S. light-sport-aircraft kit plane
- American Sportscopter Ultrasport, a series of U.S. helicopters
- Anderson Ultra Sport, a U.S. automobile
- 'Ultra Sport', a trim package for the Audi A4
- Ultrasport, a Norwegian extreme sports magazine
- Ultrasport (talk show), a Bulgarian weekly television sports talk show

== See also ==
- LAE Ultrasport 496T, a Cypriot helicopter
- Super sport (disambiguation)
- Hypersport (disambiguation)
- Megasport (disambiguation)
- Ultra (disambiguation)
- Sport (disambiguation)
