= Hypersport =

Hypersport, hyper sport, or, variation, may refer to:

- Hyper sport bike or hyper sport, a type of sport bike motorcycle
- W Motors Lykan HyperSport, a Lebanese sports car
- Hyper sport – car racing category, a sports car category that includes the race class Le Mans Hypercar
- Hyper Sport Racing, a sports car race team that contracted operations from Multimatic Motorsports

== See also ==
- Hypercar (disambiguation)
- Super sport (disambiguation)
- Ultra sport (disambiguation)
- Megasport (disambiguation)
- Hyper (disambiguation)
- Sport (disambiguation)
