= Olegov =

Olegov is a surname. Notable people with the surname include:

- Adrian Olegov (born 1985), Bulgarian footballer
- Denis Olegov (born 1998), Bulgarian writer and journalist
