= Super Sport (Chevrolet) =

Performance option package of Chevrolet car models

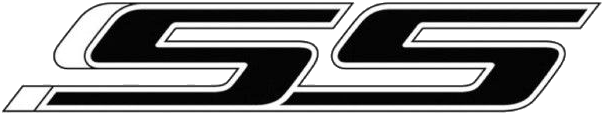

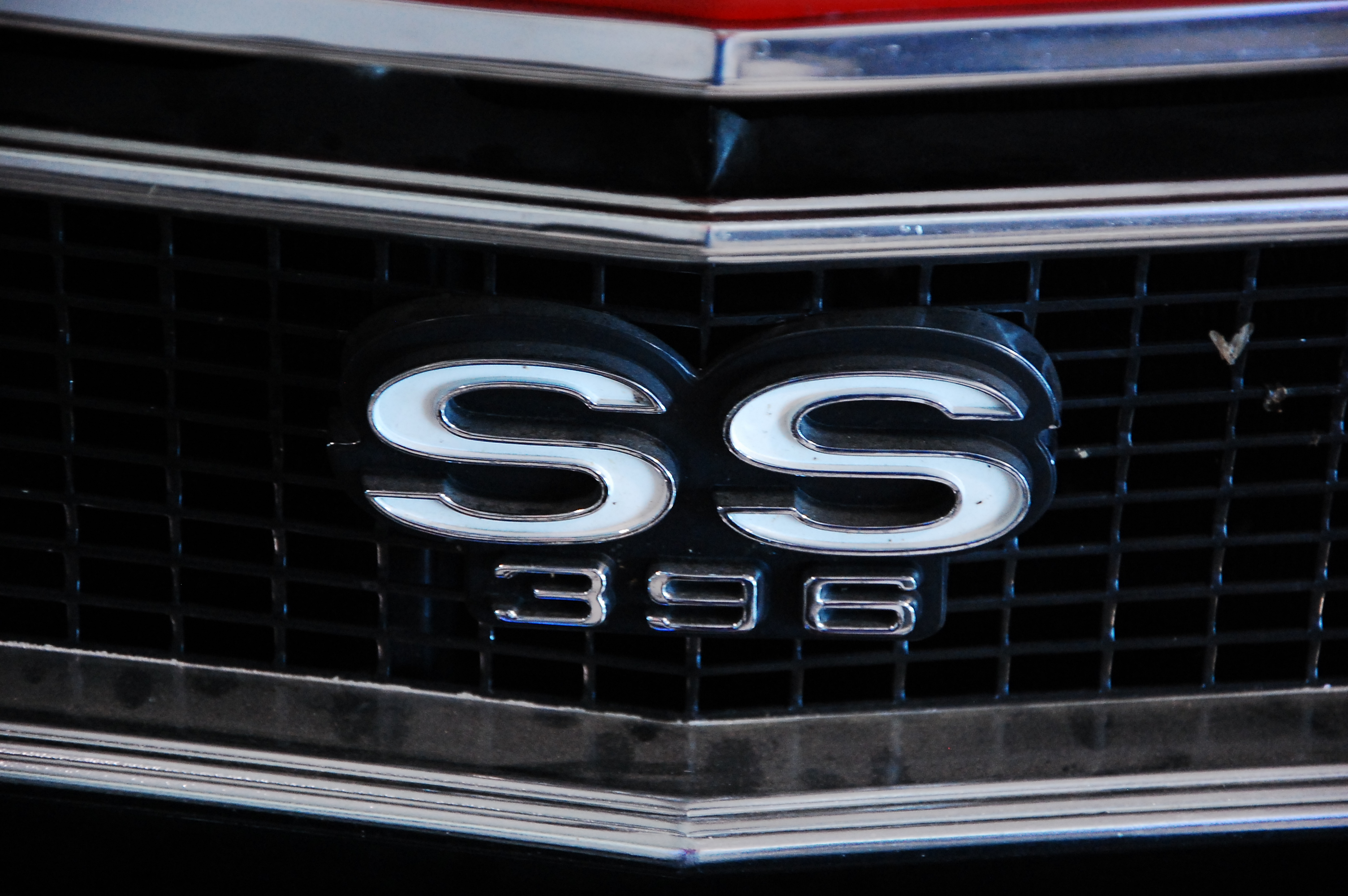
- SS 396 logo on a Chevrolet Chevelle
- Product type: Performance cars
- Current owner: General Motors
- Produced by: General Motors
- Country: United States
- Introduced: 1956; 70 years ago
- Markets: Americas, Australia

Super Sport, or SS, is the signature performance option package offered by the Chevrolet division of General Motors on a limited number of its vehicles. All SS models come with distinctive "SS" markings on their exterior. The SS package was first made available for the 1961 Impala. Some of the other models bearing the SS badge include the Camaro, Chevelle, El Camino, Impala, Monte Carlo, Nova and Chevrolet pickup trucks. Current SS models are produced by the GM Performance Division.

General Motors also offered SS models through its Australian subsidiary Holden, starting with the Holden HQ SS and Holden LX Torana SS, being continuously produced from 1989 onwards with the Holden VN Commodore SS to Holden VF Commodore SS.

== History ==
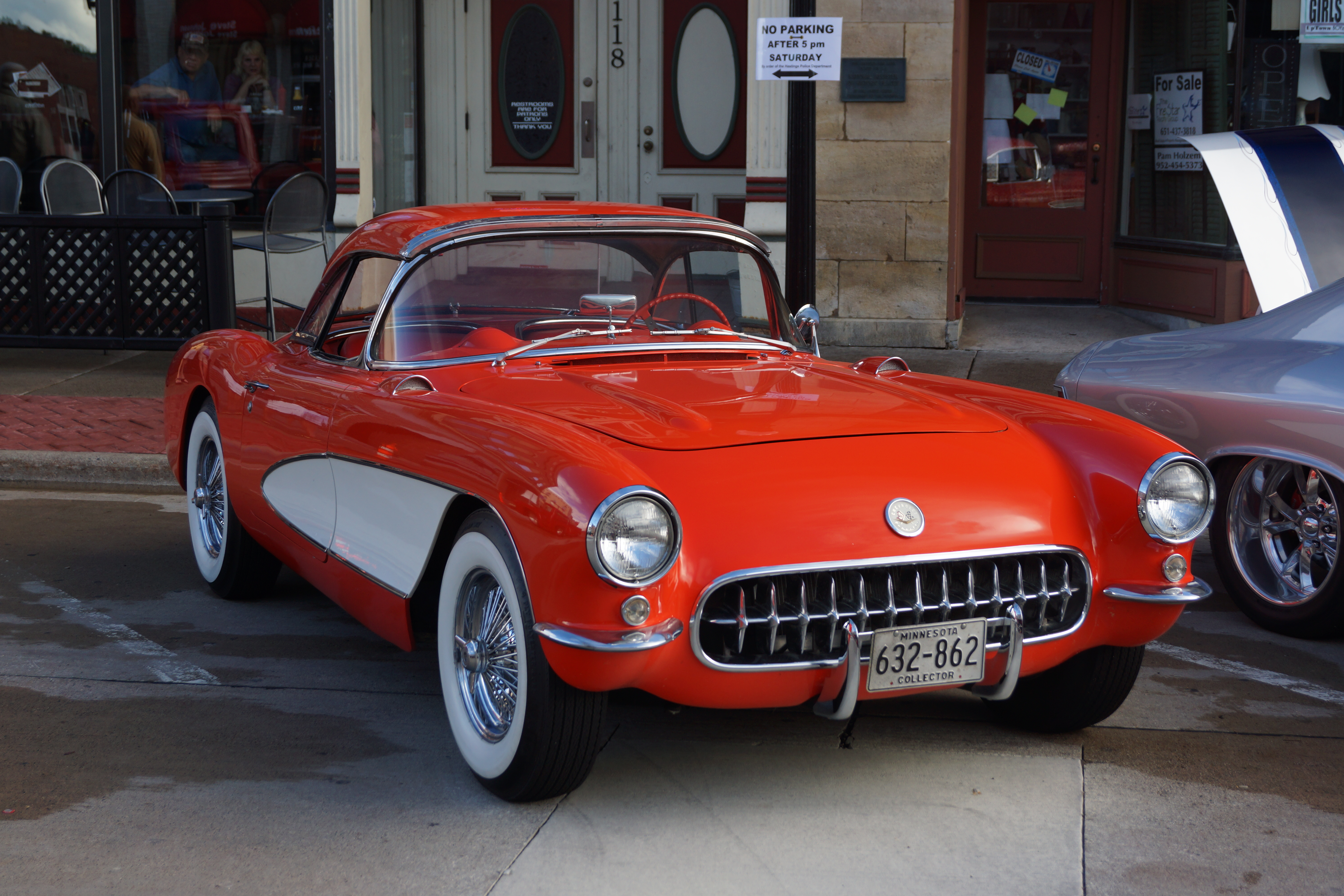
The first Chevrolet to carry the "SS" badge was based on the Corvette C1 of 1956 (pictured)

In December 1956, Chevrolet unveiled a show car based on the first generation (C1) Corvette called the Corvette Super Sport. In early 1957, the Chevrolet Corvette SS debuted — a custom built racing sports car that was the first Chevrolet to wear the SS badge.

In 1961, the SS "kit" (known as a sport and appearance package) was offered on any Impala for just $53.80. The package included Super Sport trim for both the interior and exterior, chassis reinforcements, stronger springs and shocks, power brakes, spinner wheel covers, and narrow-band whitewall tires. The car's dashboard received a Corvette style passenger hand bar and a steering column mounted 7000-rpm tachometer. Chevrolet built 491,000 Impalas that year and 453 had the SS package, of which 311 received the 348 cid and 142 received the 409 cid. Since 1994, the SS package has been used on a variety of GM vehicles, including pickup trucks, four-door sedans, and front wheel drive cars.

Both historically and today, the Super Sport package has typically included high-performance tires, heavy-duty suspension, and increased power, along with a variety of other performance and appearance upgrades.

== SS models ==
=== Current SS models ===
- Chevrolet Blazer EV: A 615 hp (459 kW) EV using the Ultium battery pack.

=== Previous SS models ===
==== Cars ====
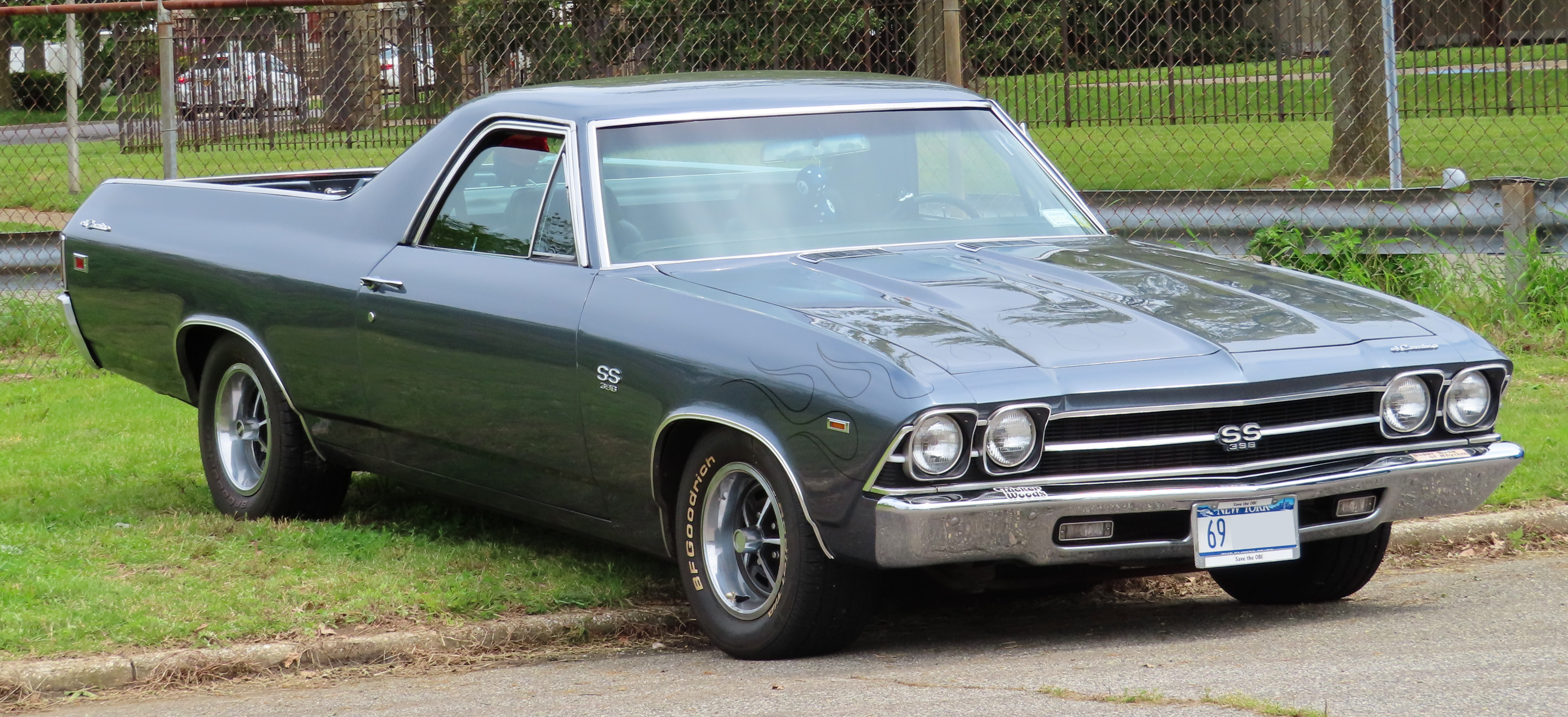
1969 Chevrolet El Camino SS

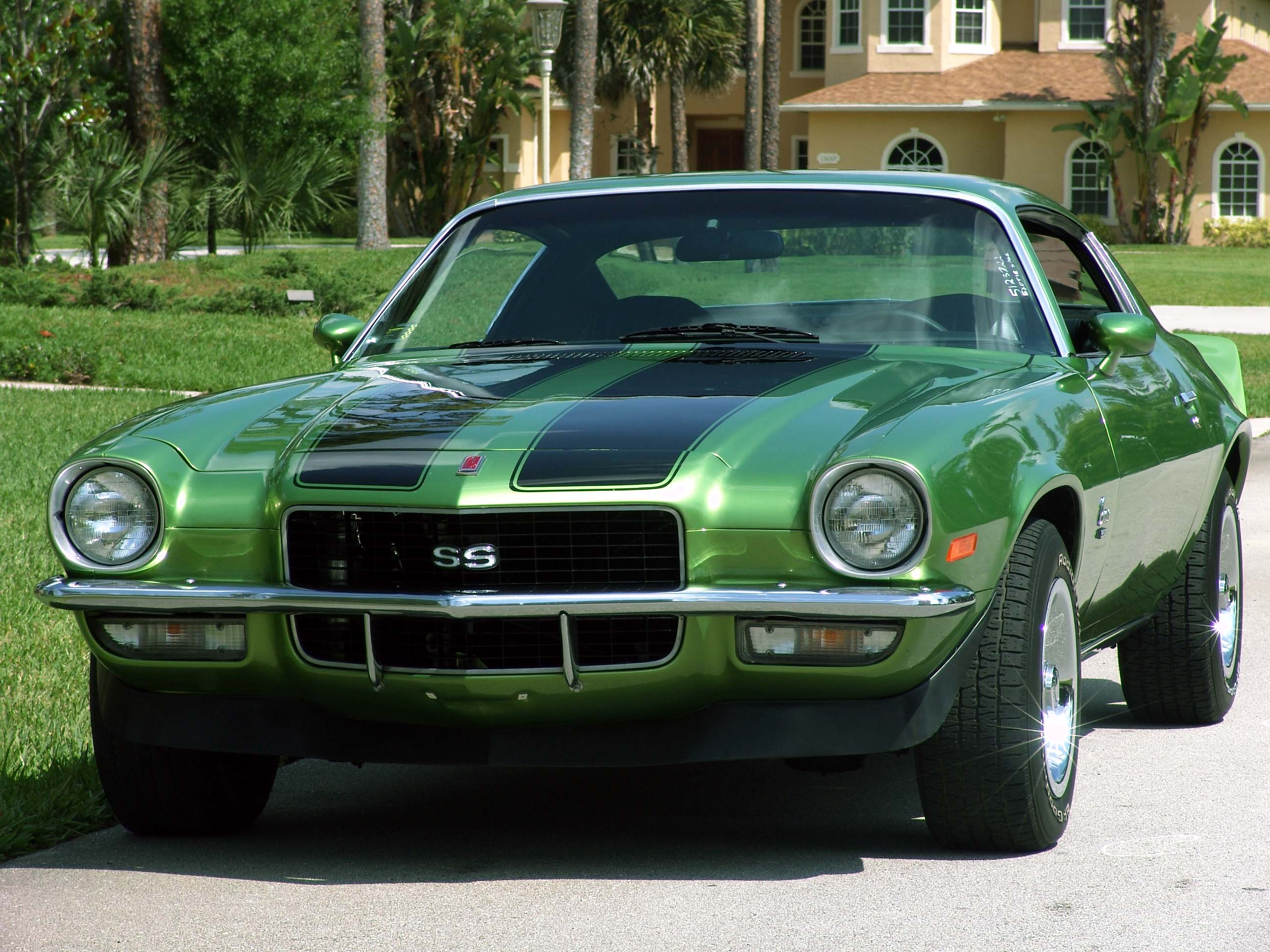
1971 Chevrolet Camaro SS

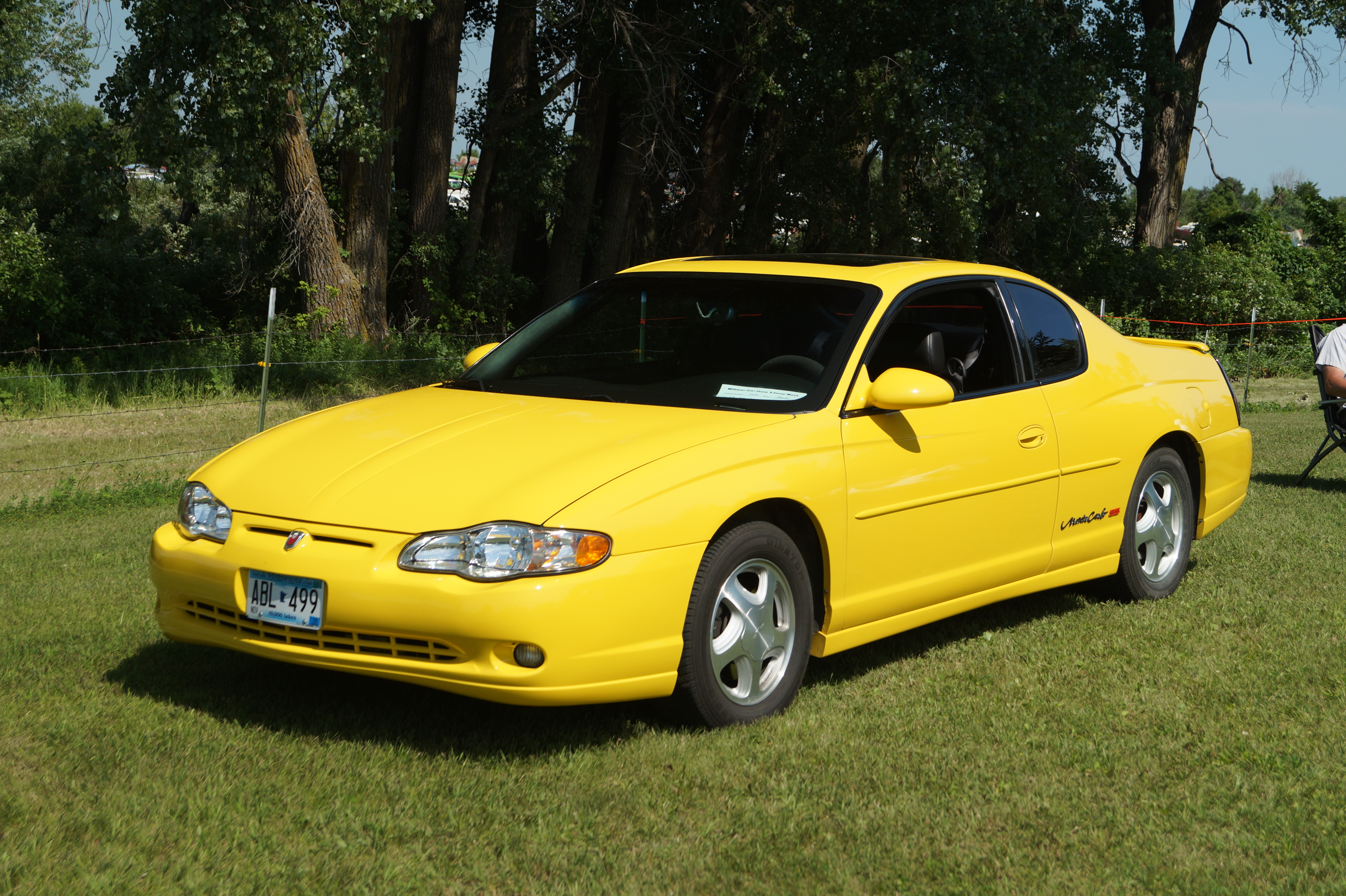
2003 Chevrolet Monte Carlo SS

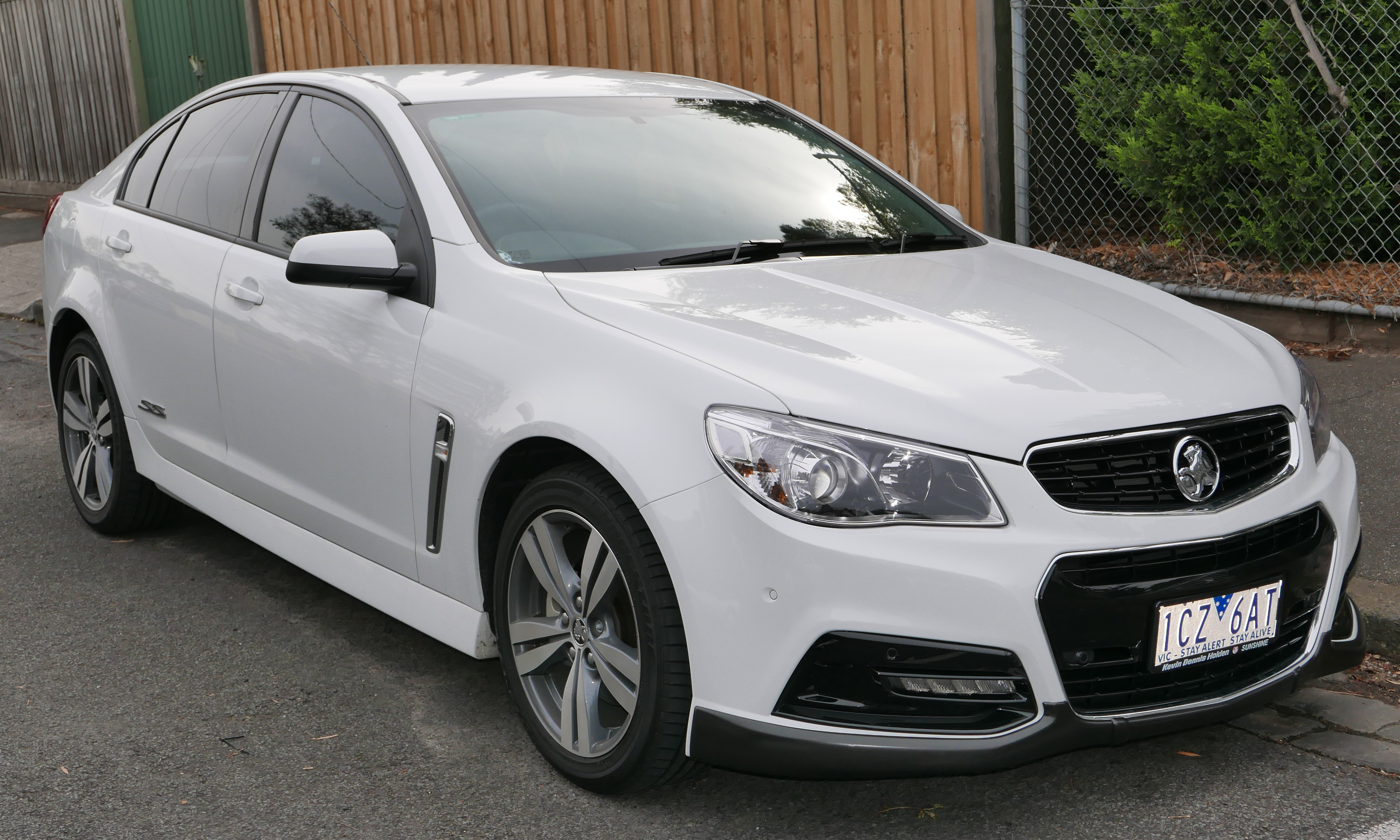
2014 Holden Commodore SS

- Chevrolet (Commodore) SS: 6.2 L (380 cu in) LS3 V8 producing 415 hp (309 kW) 2014-2017
- Chevrolet Cobalt: 2.0 L (120 cu in) turbocharged Ecotec LNF I4 producing 260 hp (194 kW) 2008–2010 (4 door, 2009)
- Chevrolet Cobalt: 2.0 L (120 cu in) supercharged Ecotec LSJ I4 producing 205 hp (153 kW) 2005–2007
- Chevrolet Cobalt: 2.4 L (150 cu in) Ecotec LE5 I4 producing 171 hp (128 kW) 2006–2008
- Chevrolet HHR: 2.0 L (120 cu in) turbocharged Ecotec LNF I4 producing 260 hp (194 kW) 2008–2010
- Chevrolet Impala 1961–1969, 1994–1996, 2004–2009
- Chevrolet Malibu/Malibu Maxx 2006–2007
- Chevrolet Chevelle 1964–1973
- Chevrolet Camaro 1967–1972, 1996–2002, 2010–2024
- Chevrolet El Camino 1968–1987
- Chevrolet Chevy II Nova 1963–1968
- Chevrolet Nova 1969–1976
- Chevrolet Monte Carlo 1970–1971, 1983–1988, 2000–2007

==== Trucks ====
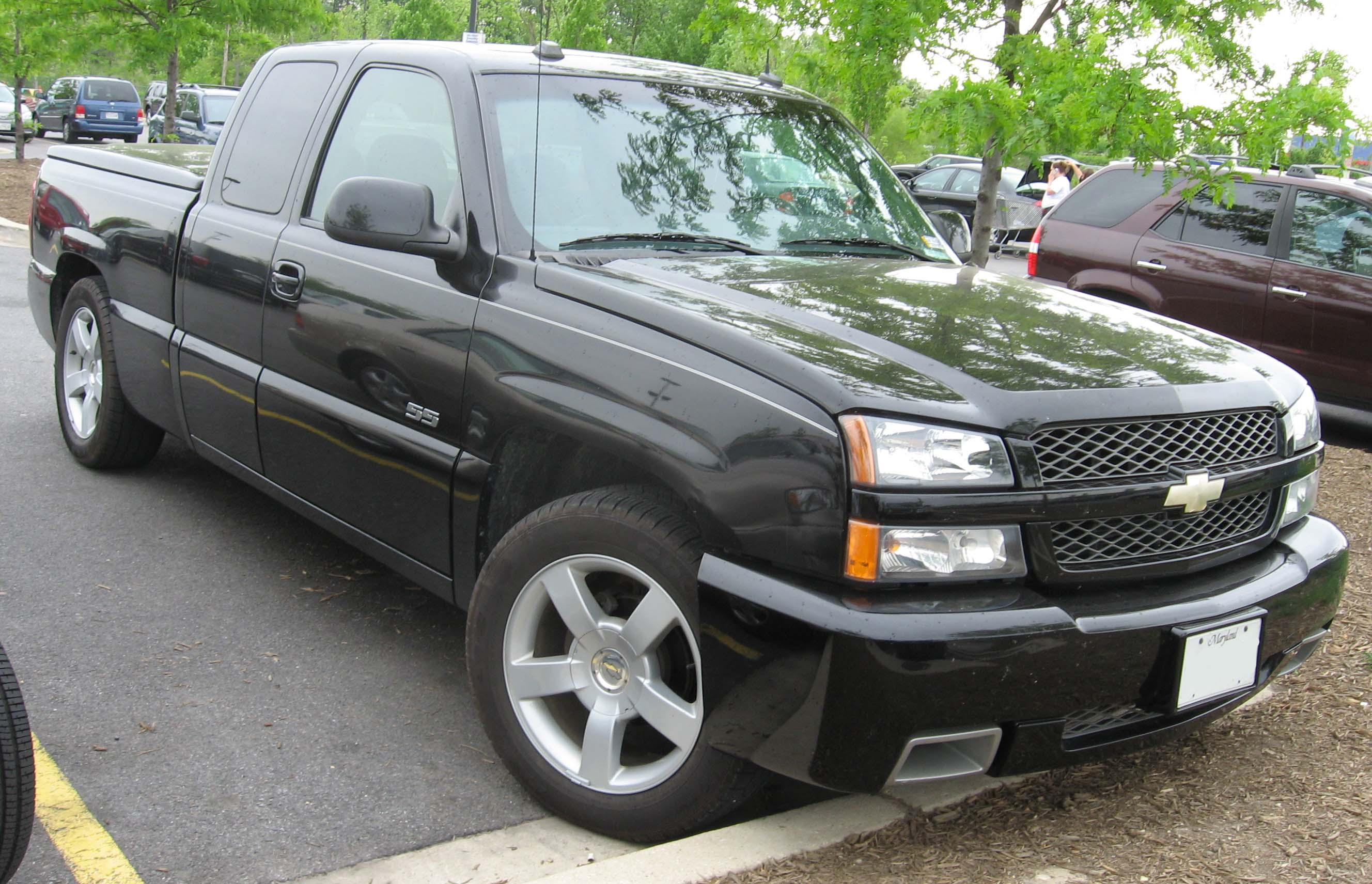
2003 Chevrolet Silverado SS

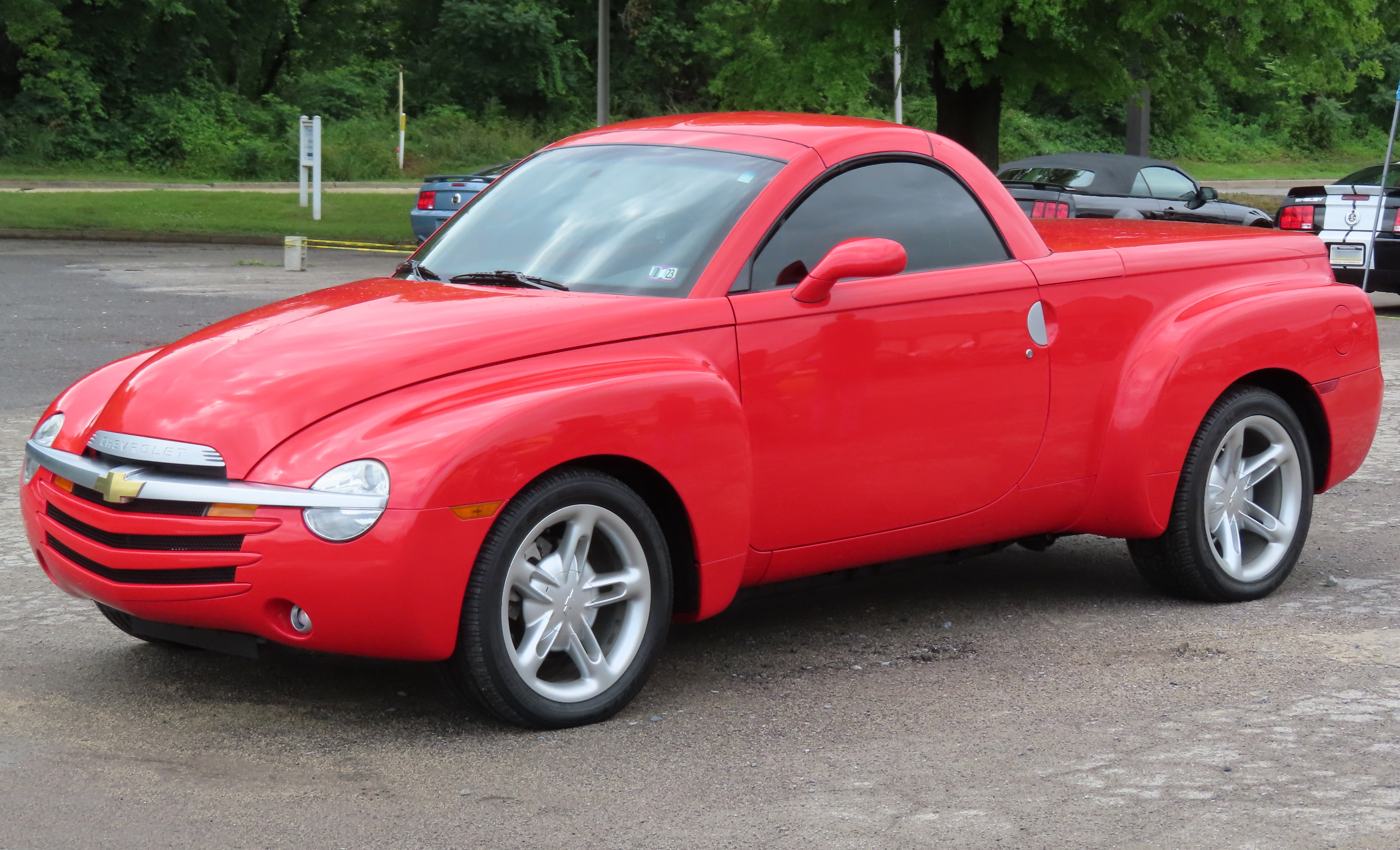
2004 Chevrolet SSR

- Chevrolet 454 SS 1990–1993
- Chevrolet S10 SS 1994–1998
- Chevrolet SSR: 6.0 L (370 cu in) LS2 V8
- Chevrolet Silverado SS
- Chevrolet Silverado Intimidator SS
- Chevrolet TrailBlazer SS: 6.0 L (370 cu in) LS2 V8 2006–2009

=== Middle Eastern market ===
- Chevrolet Caprice: rebadge of Impala SS (performance version of 4th generation Chevrolet Caprice sedan), 5.7 L (350 cu in) LT1 V8 producing 260 hp (264 PS; 194 kW) 1995–1996
- Chevrolet Caprice: rebadge of Holden Caprice, 5.7 L (350 cu in) LS1 V8 producing 350 hp (355 PS; 261 kW) 1999–2006, 6.0 L (370 cu in) L98 V8 producing 360 hp (365 PS; 268 kW) 2006–2009, 6.0 L (370 cu in) L77 V8 producing 350 hp (355 PS; 261 kW) 2009–2015, 6.2 L (380 cu in) LS3 V8 producing 410 hp (416 PS; 306 kW) 2015–2017
- Chevrolet Lumina coupé: rebadge of third generation Holden Monaro CV8, 5.7 L (350 cu in) LS1 V8 producing 350 hp (355 PS; 261 kW) 2002–2006
- Chevrolet Lumina sedan: rebadge of Holden Commodore SS sedan 2000–2011

=== South African market ===
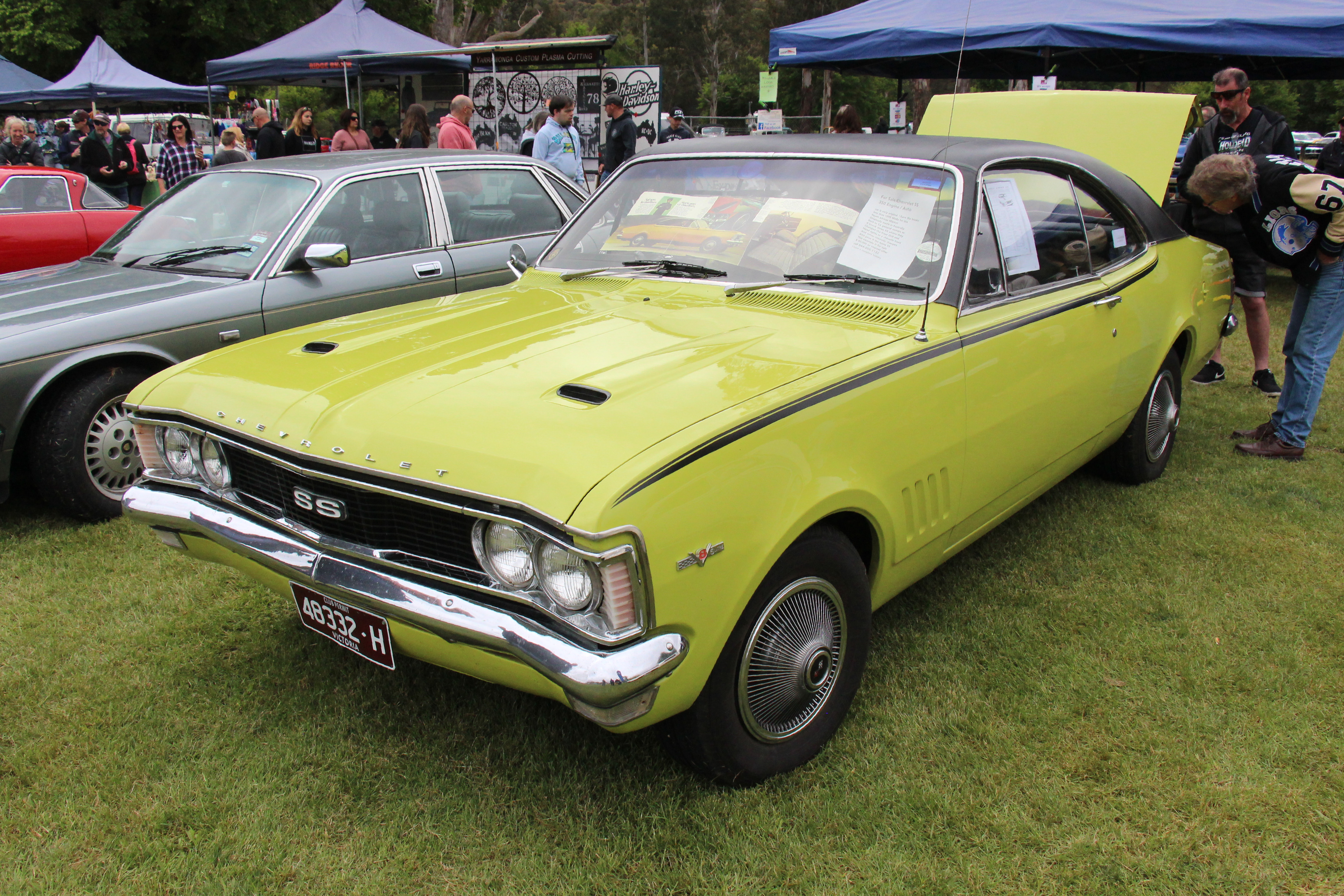
1971 Chevrolet SS (Holden HG Monaro)

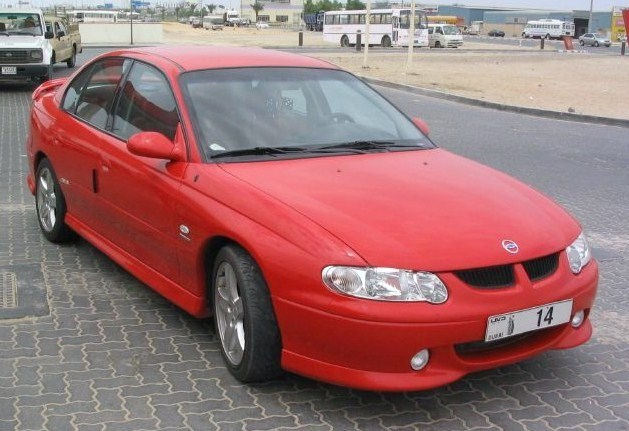
2000-2001 Lumina SS (Holden Commodore VF)

For a short period of time in the early 1970s, a Holden Monaro–based "Chevrolet SS" model, similar in design, size and drivetrain to a Nova SS, was available in South Africa. Unlike the contemporary Nova, it was built as a hardtop, without fixed #2 or B-pillars or frames around the door glass.

Similar to Middle Eastern market, Holden Commodore-based Chevrolet Lumina SS was also offered in South Africa as sedan and also as ute until 2012.

=== Argentinian market ===
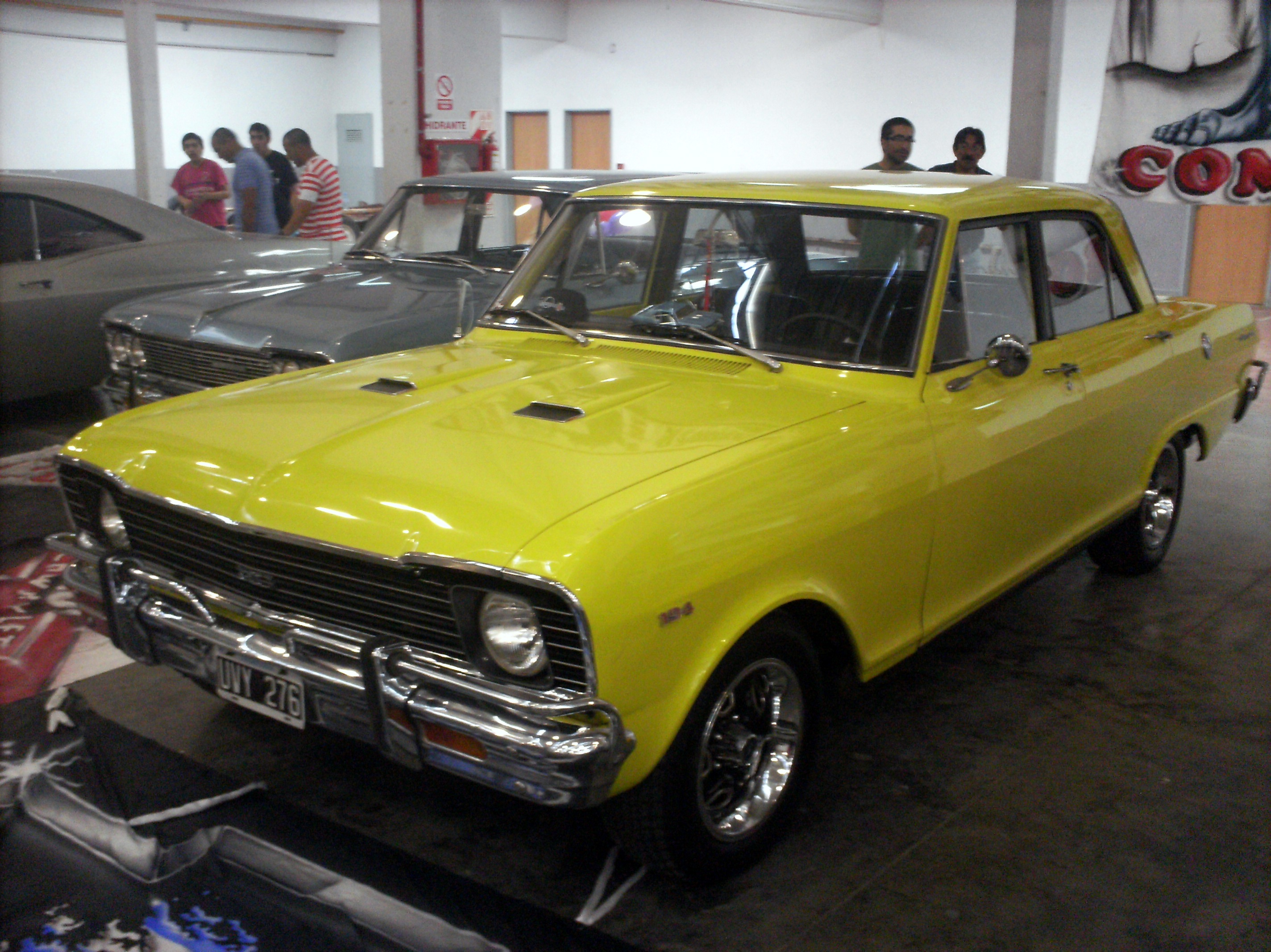
1965 Chevrolet 400 SS

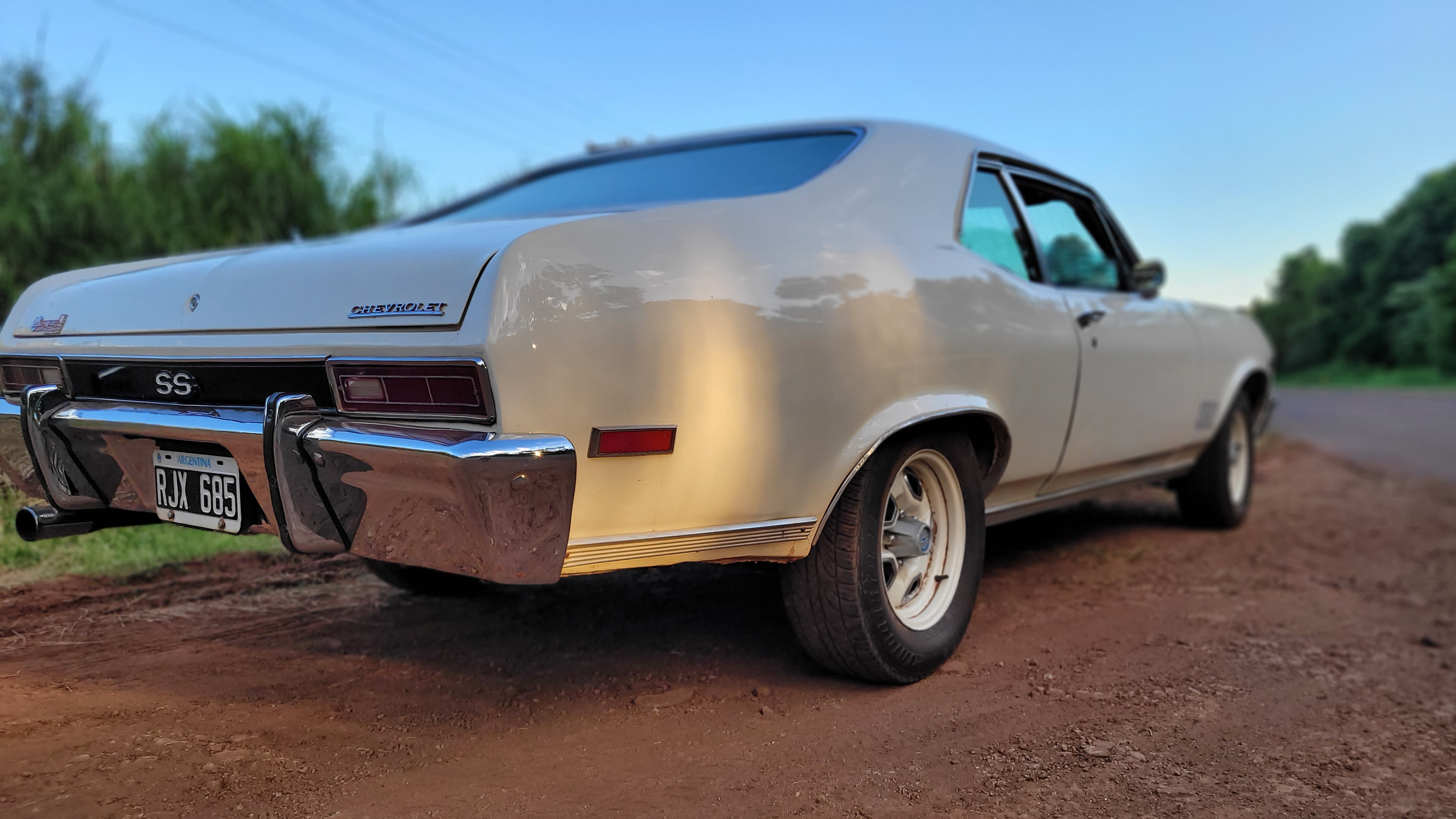
1977 Chevrolet Chevy Serie 2 SS

- Chevrolet 400 (Chevy II in US market): 250 I6 - 250 inches. cub. 4097 cc - 155 hp.
- Chevrolet Chevy (Nova in US market): 250 I6 - 250 inches. cub. 4097 cc - 155 hp.
- Chevrolet Chevy Serie 2: 250 I6 - 250 inches. cub. 4097 cc - 170 hp.

=== Brazilian market ===
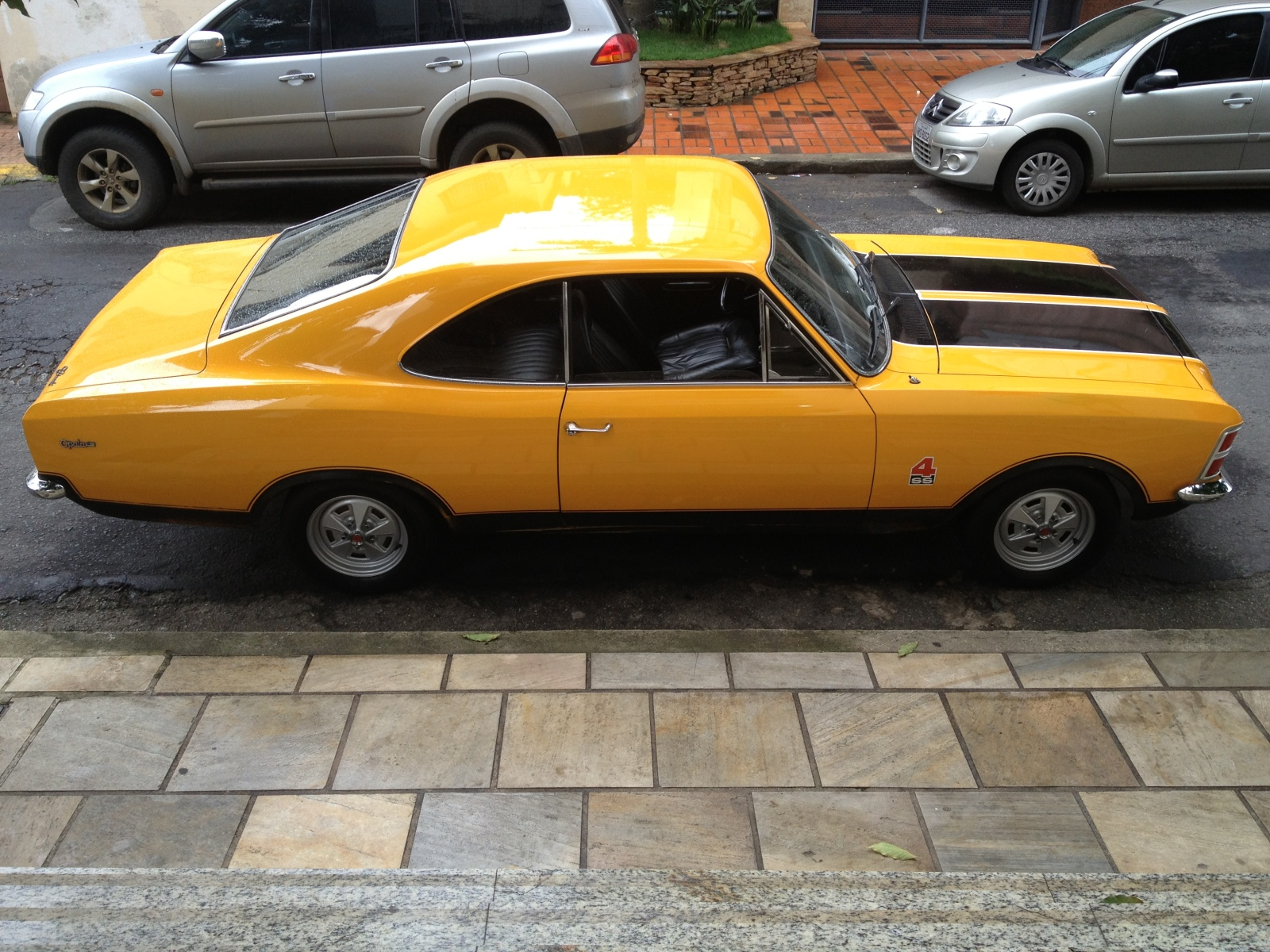
1976 Chevrolet Opala SS I4

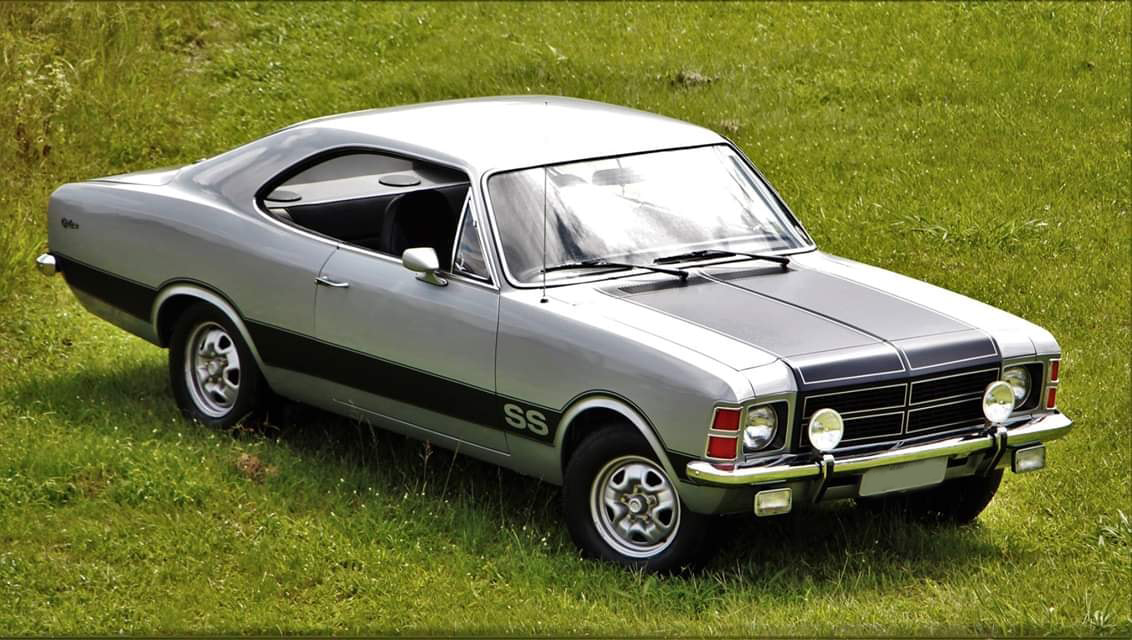
1978 Chevrolet Opala SS I6

Classics:

- Chevrolet Opala: 4.1 L (250 cu in) 250 I6 producing 150 hp (152 PS; 112 kW) 1971–1974
- Chevrolet Opala: 4.1 L (250 cu in) 250-S I6 producing 171 hp (173 PS; 128 kW) 1974–1980
- Chevrolet Opala 2.5 L (150 cu in) 151-S I4 producing 98 hp (99 PS; 73 kW) 1974–1980

New Era:

- Chevrolet Astra 2.0 L (120 cu in) Family II I4 producing 130 hp (132 PS; 97 kW) 2006
- Chevrolet Corsa 1.8 L (110 cu in) Family 1 SOHC 8-valve I4 producing 115 hp (117 PS; 86 kW) 2006
- Chevrolet Meriva 1.8 L (110 cu in) Family 1 SOHC 8-valve I4 producing 115 hp (117 PS; 86 kW) 2006

=== Australia (Holden) ===
Holden SS models

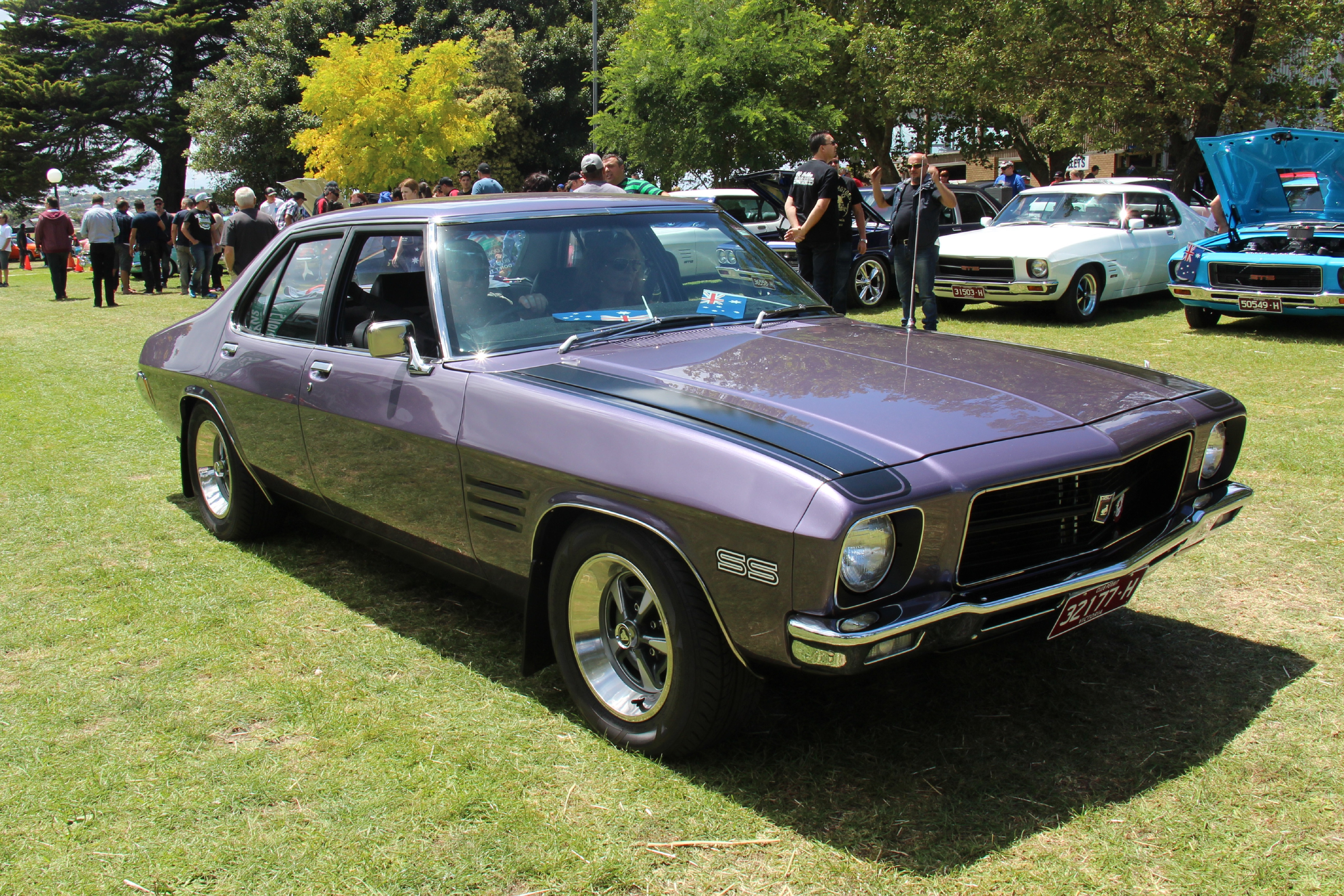
1972 HQ

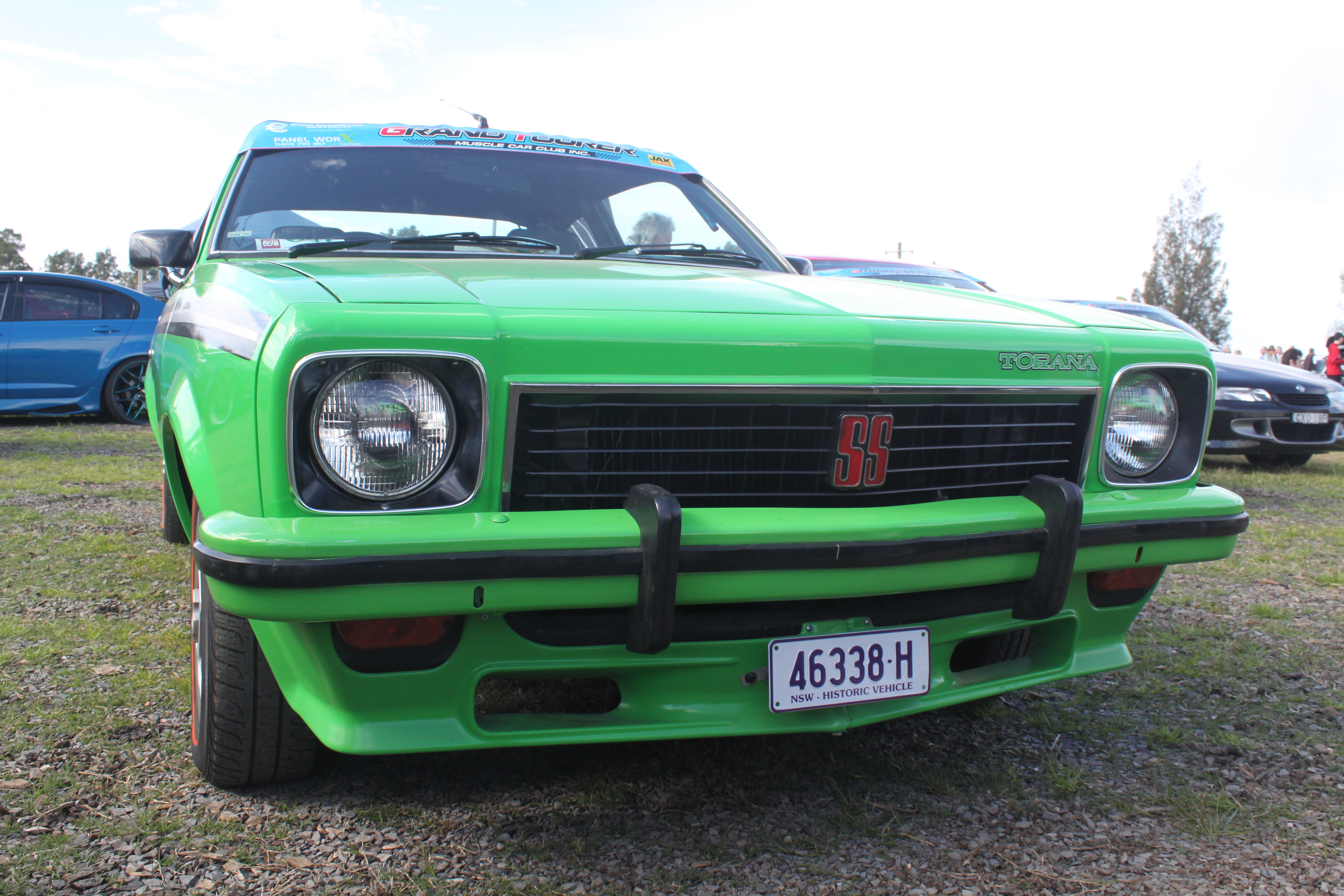
1976 Torana

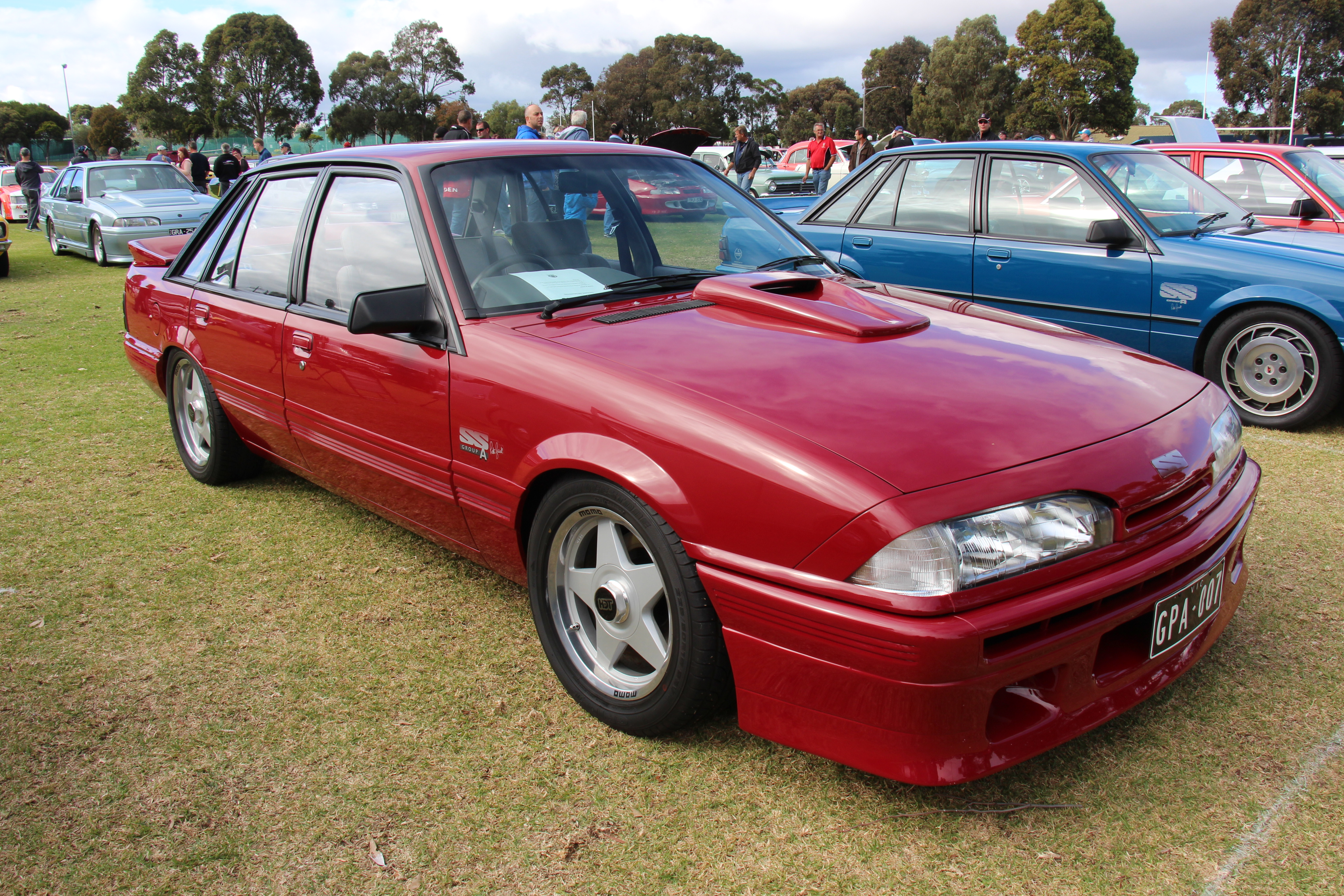
1986 Commodore VL

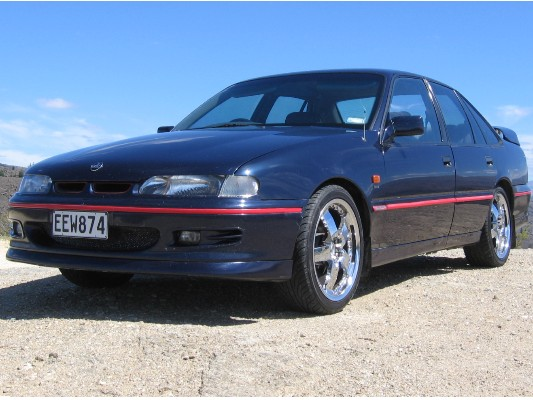
1994 Commodore VR

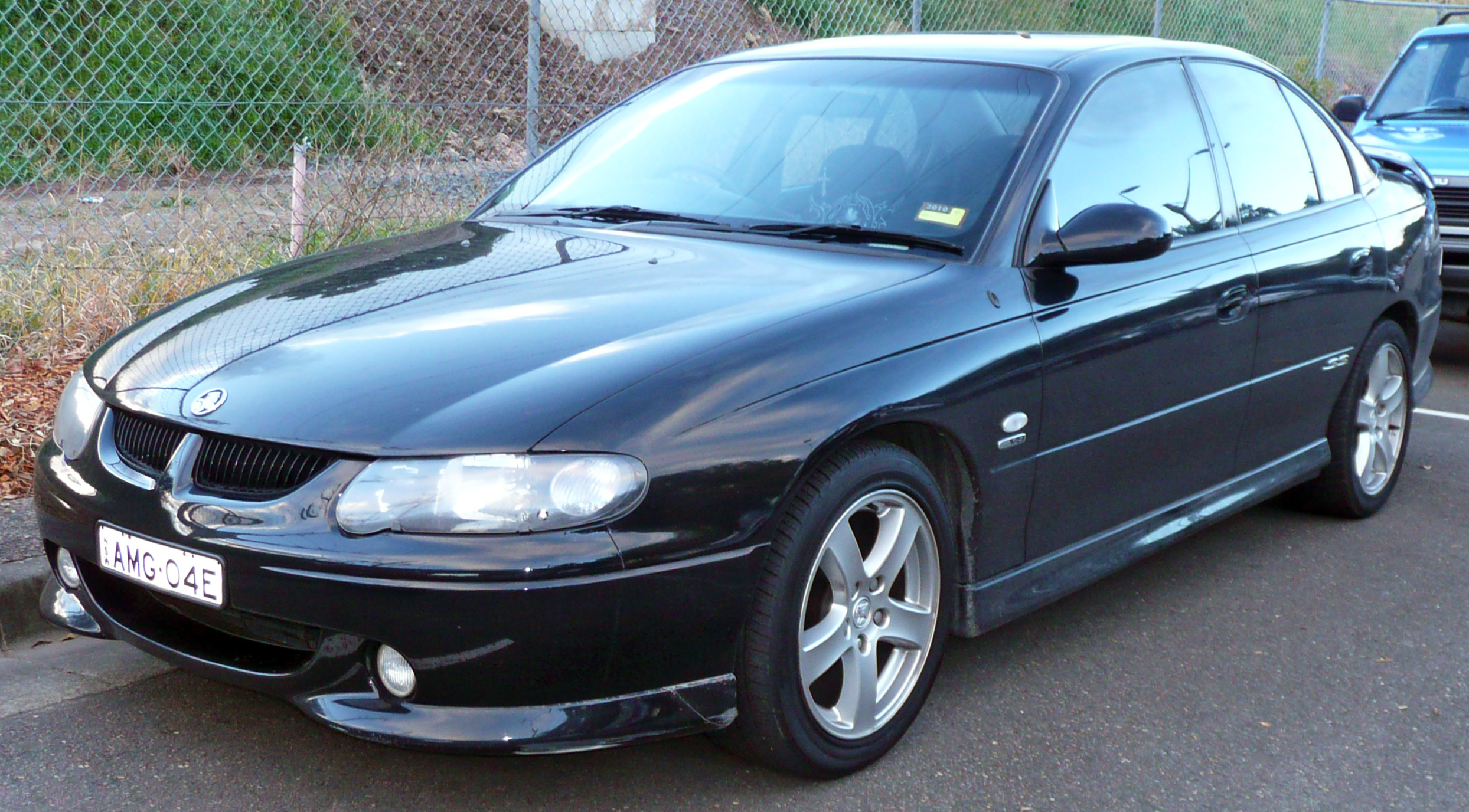
2001 Commodore VX II

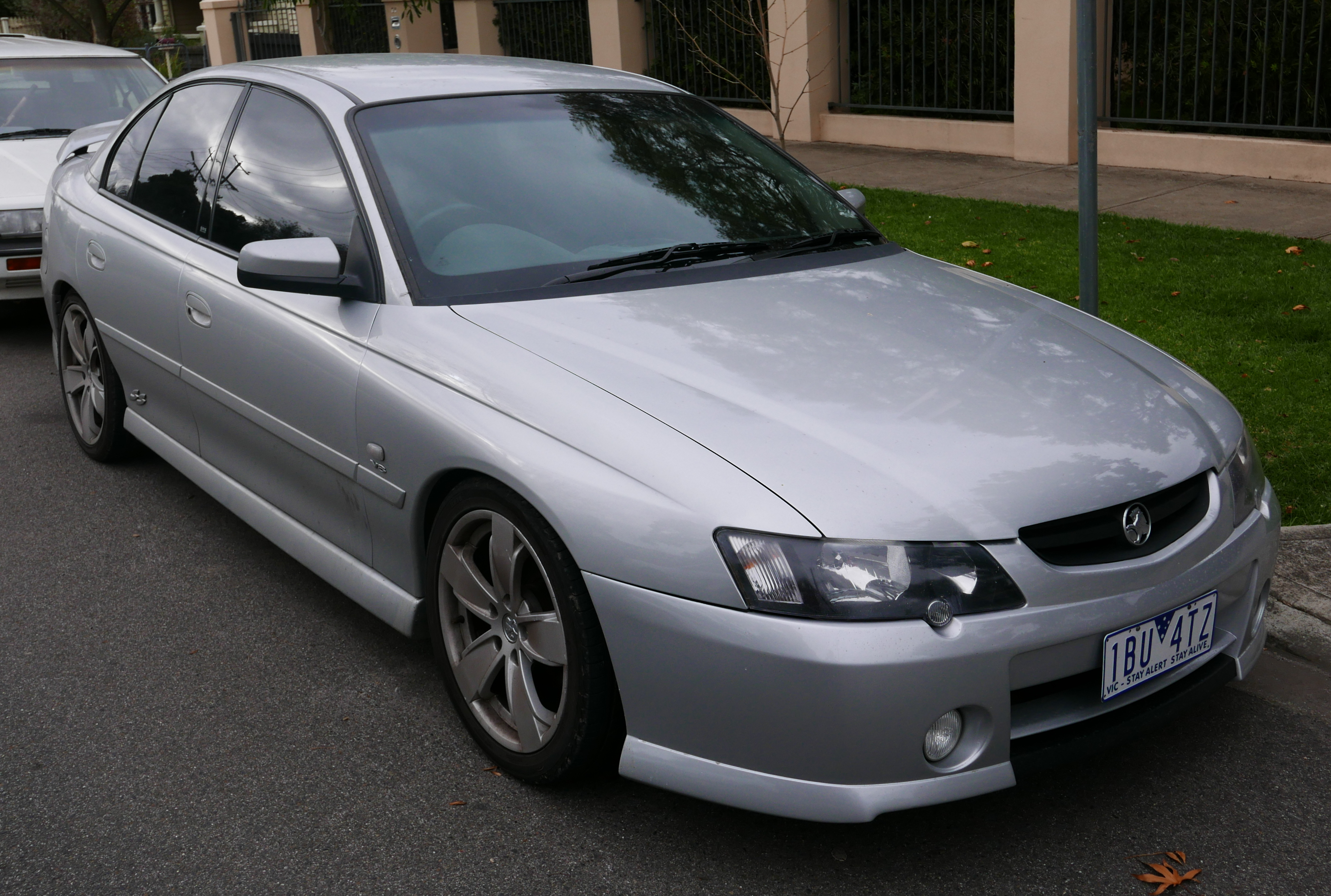
2002 Commodore VY

Classics:

- Holden SS Sedan: 4.2L (253 cu in) 253 V8 or 5.0L (308 cu in) 308 V8
- Holden LX Torana SS Hatchback: 3.3L (202 cu in) 202 I6, 4.2L (253 cu in) 253 V8 or 5.0L (308 cu in) 308 V8
- Holden VL Commodore SS: 5.0L (304 cu in) 5000i V8
- Holden Special Vehicles Group A SS: 5.0L (304 cu in) Enhanced 5000i V8
- Holden VN Commodore SS: 5.0L (304 cu in) 5000i V8
- Holden VN Commodore SS: 5.0L (304 cu in) 5000i V8
- Holden VP Commodore SS: 5.0L (304 cu in) 5000i V8
- Holden VP Commodore SS: 3.8L (231.3 cu in) 3800i V6 (A9H)
- Holden VR Commodore SS: 5.0L (304 cu in) 5000i V8
- Holden VT Commodore SS: 5.0L (304 cu in) 5000i V8 or 5.7L (350 cu in) GM Gen III LS1 V8

Modern Era:

- Holden VX Commodore SS: 5.7L (350 cu in) GM Gen III LS1 V8
- Holden VU Ute SS: 5.7L (350 cu in) GM Gen III LS1 V8
- Holden VY Commodore SS: 5.7L (350 cu in) GM Gen III LS1 V8
- Holden VY Ute SS: 5.7L (350 cu in) GM Gen III LS1 V8
- Holden VY Series II Commodore SS: 5.7L (350 cu in) GM Gen III LS1 V8
- Holden VY Series II Ute SS: 5.7L (350 cu in) GM Gen III LS1 V8
- Holden VZ Commodore SS: 5.7L (350 cu in) GM Gen III LS1 V8
- Holden VZ Ute SS: 5.7L (350 cu in) GM Gen III LS1 V8
- Limited Run VZ SSZ Runout Models both Sedan and Ute
- Holden VE Commodore SS: 6.0L (364 cu in) GM Gen III L98 V8 2007-2010
- Holden VE Ute SS: 6.0L (364 cu in) GM Gen IV L98 V8 2008-2010
- Holden VE Sportwagon SS: 6.0L (364 cu in) GM Gen IV L98 V8 2009-2010
- Holden VE Series II Commodore SS: 6.0L (364 cu in) GM Gen III L77 V8 2010-2013
- Holden VE Series II Ute SS: 6.0L (364 cu in) GM Gen III L77 V8 2010-2013
- Holden VE Series II Sportwagon SS: 6.0L (364 cu in) GM Gen IV L77 V8 2010-2013
- All Models Available in Race-Specced 'SS V' Variant
- Holden VF Commodore SS: 6.0L (364 cu in) GM Gen IV L77 V8 2013-2015
- Holden VF Ute SS: 6.0L (364 cu in) GM Gen IV L77 V8 2013-2015
- Holden VF Sportwagon SS: 6.0L (364 cu in) GM Gen IV L77 V8 2013-2015
- Holden VF Series II Commodore SS: 6.2L (376 cu in) GM Gen IV LS3 V8 2015-2017
- Holden VF Series II Ute SS: 6.2L (376 cu in) GM Gen IV LS3 V8 2015-2017
- Holden VF Series II Sportwagon SS: 6.2L (376 cu in) GM Gen IV LS3 V8 2015-2017
- Series I Models Available in Race-Specced 'SS V' Variant
- Series II Models Available in Race-Specced 'SS V Redline' Variant

=== Indonesian market ===
- Chevrolet Captiva 2.4 L (150 cu in) Ecotec LE5 I4 producing 171 hp (173 PS; 128 kW) 2011

== Concept car ==
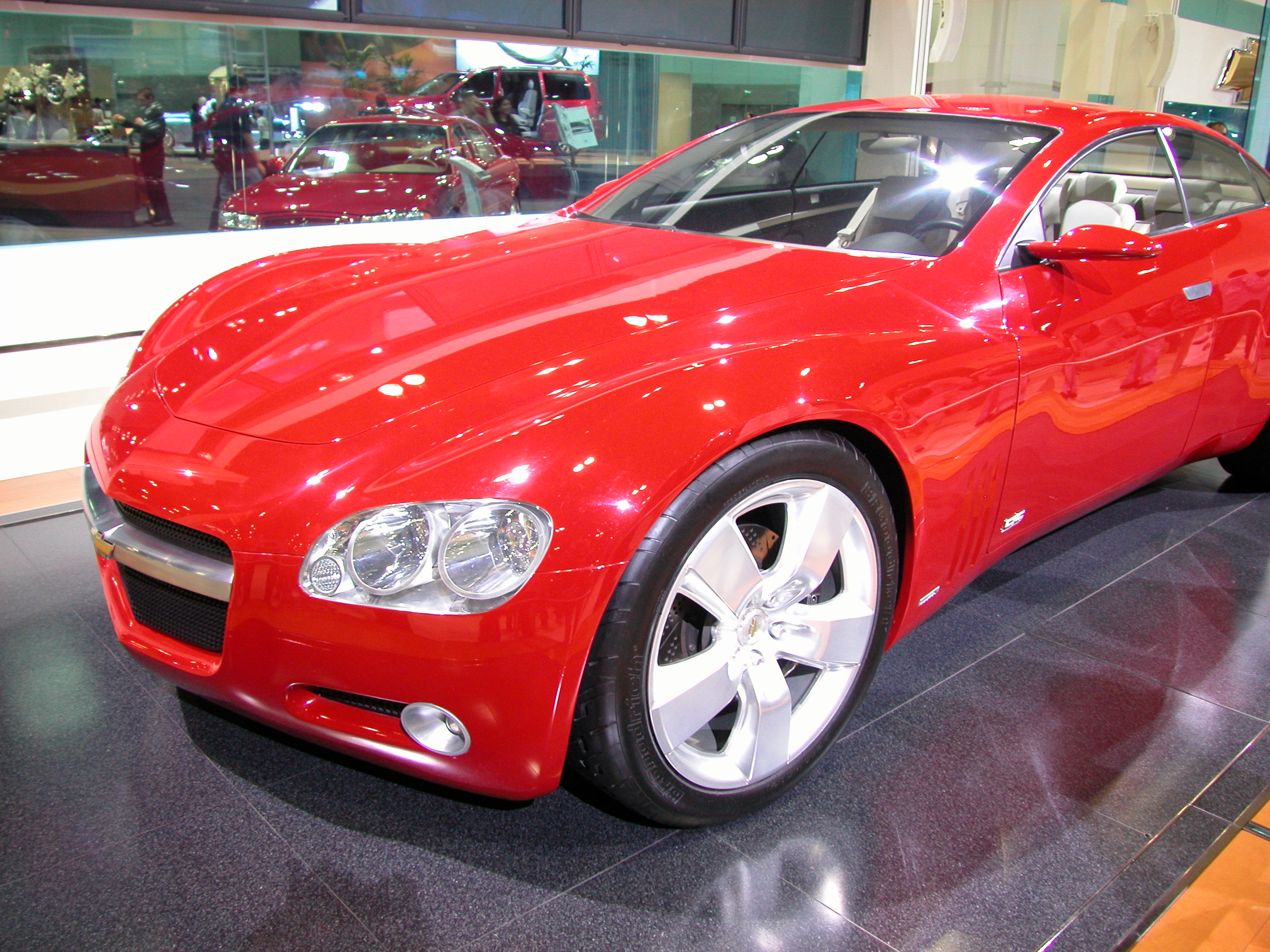
Chevrolet SS (concept car) (front) at the 2004 Los Angeles Auto Show

In 2003, Chevrolet released a concept car they named the SS. A rear wheel drive sports car with a modern 430 hp small-block V8 engine and race-tuned suspension, it was billed as "a modern interpretation of Chevrolet's Super Sport heritage". Though never intended for production, the vehicle was used as a show car and to hint at what was ahead for Chevrolet sports car design.

== Collectors market ==
It is usually easy to visually differentiate an SS from a "plain-Jane" model. However, it is more difficult to tell the difference between a genuine SS and a "clone", a non-SS vehicle that has been altered to look like an SS. Because of the number of SS clones in the marketplace, potential buyers are advised to do their research and contact their local car clubs for help to ensure that the vehicle is a true SS by running the VIN codes and casting numbers on the engine (this also includes the vehicle's build sheet especially if the SS package was a factory option). Other non-SS vehicles altered to appear like them only use trim panels rather than aftermarket mechanical parts.
