= Tunturi =

Finnish vehicle and equipment manufacturer

Exercise equipment
- Industry: Exercise equipment, vehicles
- Founded: 1922
- Headquarters: Finland
- Website: tunturi.com/en/

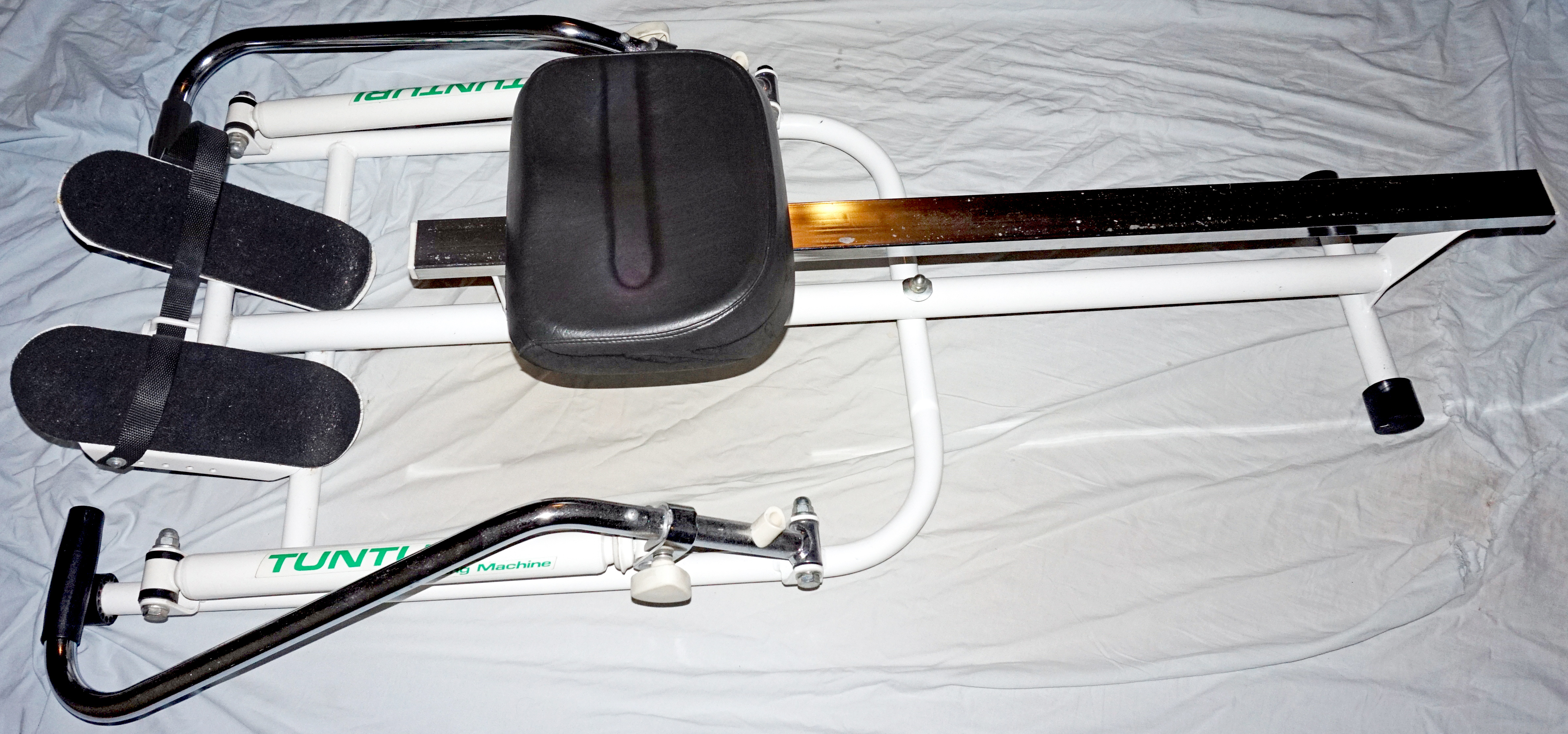
Tunturi Rowing Machine

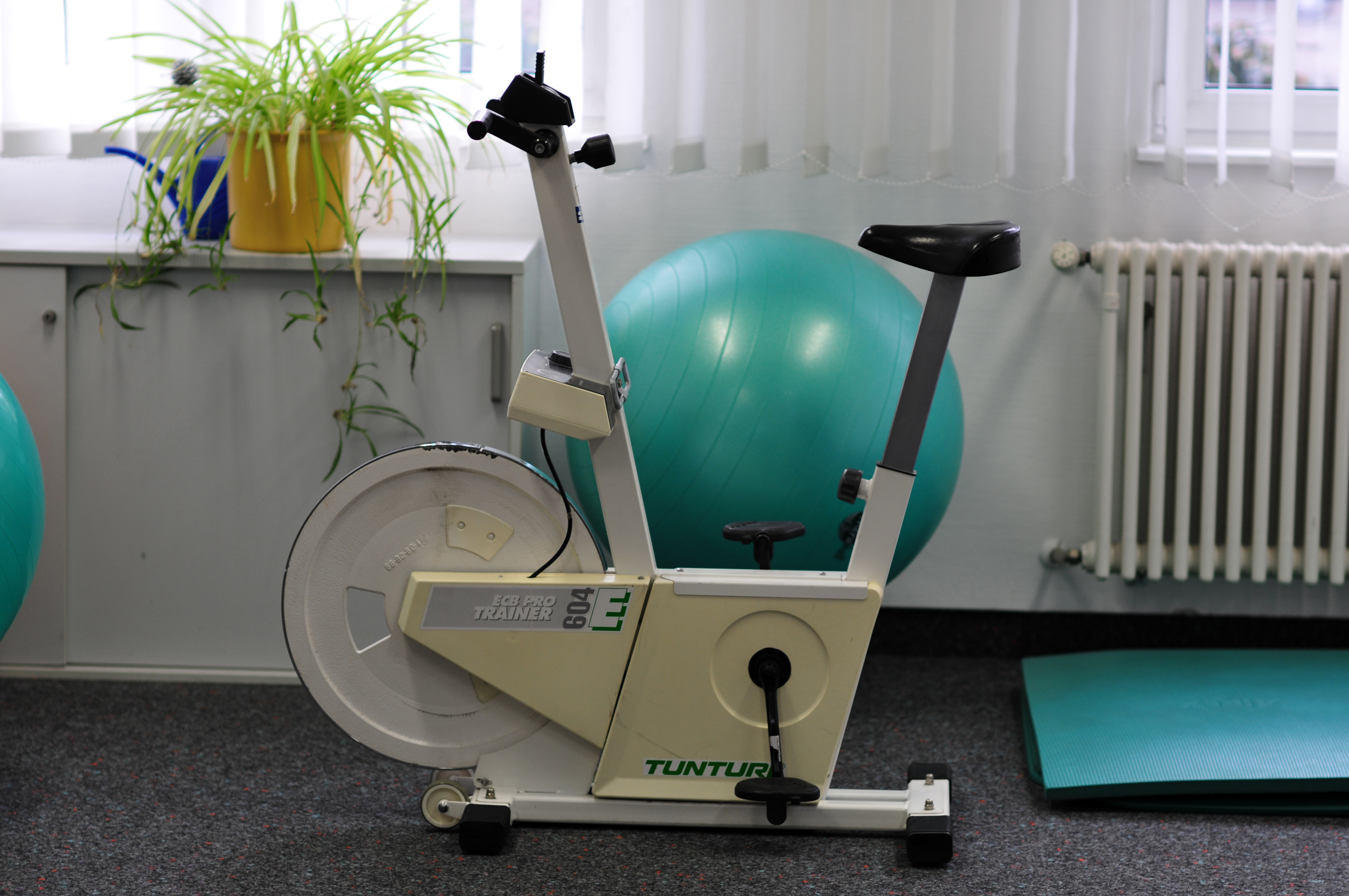
Tunturi Indoor cycling

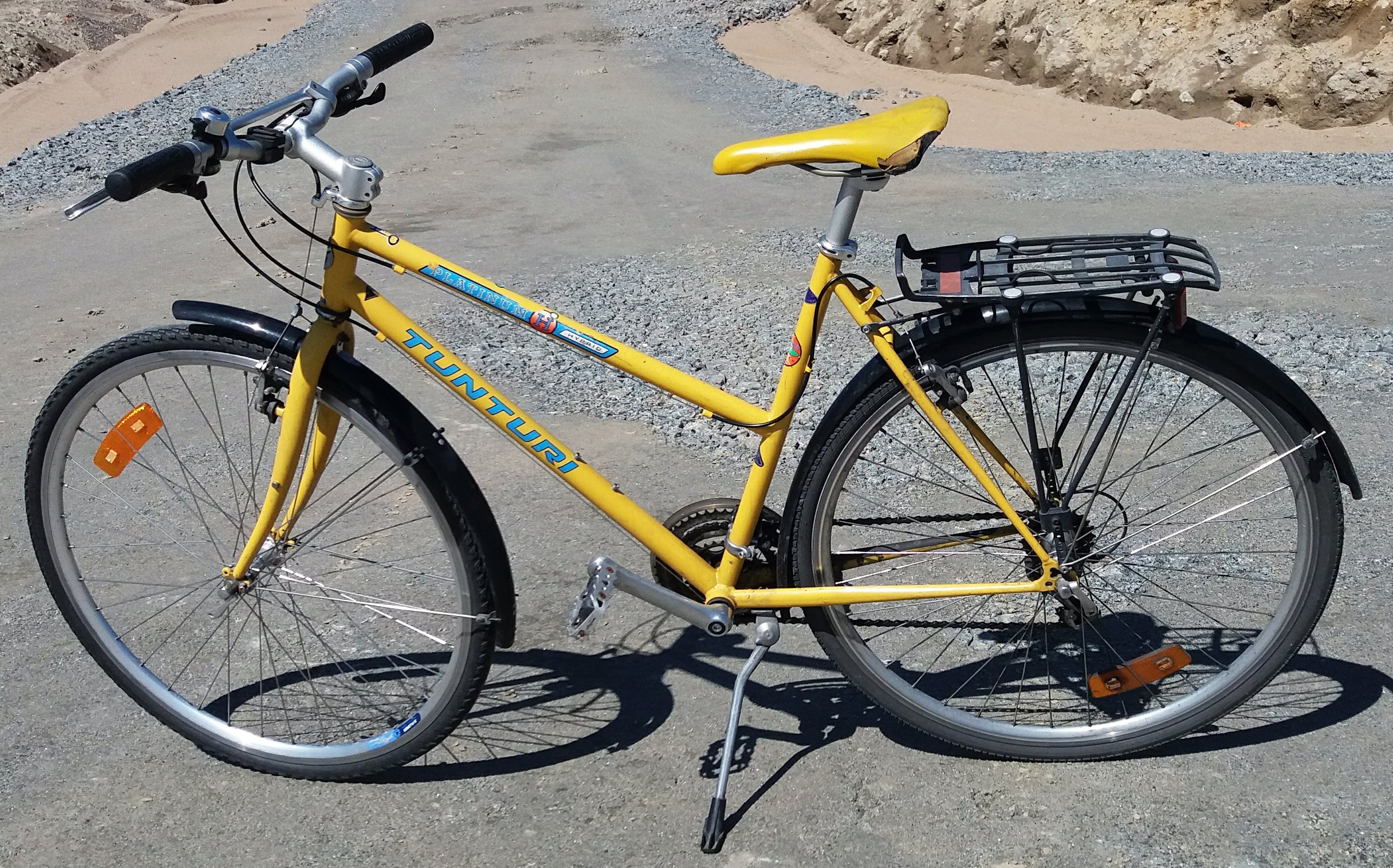
Tunturi Bicycle

Tunturi is a Finnish manufacturer of bicycles and formerly of mopeds and fitness equipment. The company was founded in 1922 in Turku, Finland. Today, Tunturi is located in Almere, Netherlands and is owned by Accell Group.

== History ==
Tunturi's history began in 1922. The foundations of the Tunturi brand began when brothers Aarne and Eero Harkke set up a small bike shop, Pyöräkellari Oy, in Turku, Finland. The name Tunturi comes from the Finnish word for a fell. Bike repairs were the shop's main focus at first, and then gradually they added some small-scale production, manufacturing Tunturi branded bicycles. The brand was very successful and within a few years the small shop was exchanged for a factory. By the 1950s the Tunturi brand was the domestic market leader in mopeds.

Utilising technology and expertise gained from bicycle production, Tunturi expanded into fitness equipment development. In 1969, the company introduced world's first home exercise bike with an ergometer, which contributed significantly to its international recognition as a producer of fitness equipment in the 1970s.

In the 1990s, a strategic decision was made to focus on the production of Tunturi fitness products and Tunturi bicycles. Tunturi is now a well-known brand in Scandinavian countries and Tunturi fitness products are sold in over 40 countries worldwide.

The Accell Group acquired Tunturi in 2003. In 2014 the fitness division was sold.

== Moped models ==
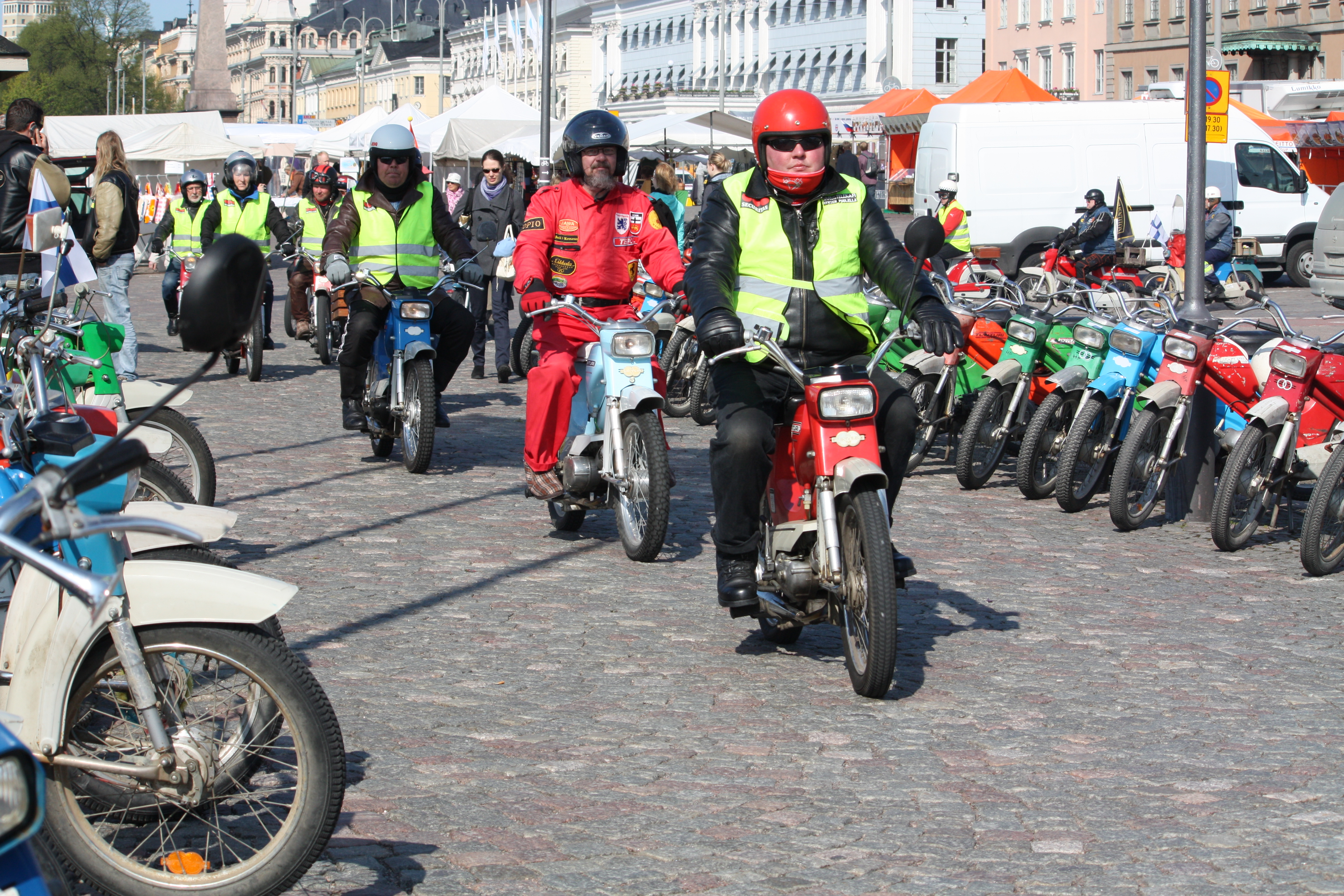
Tunturi moped Parade in Helsinki

- Tunturi Tuisku
- Tunturi Maxi
- Tunturi Automat
- Tunturi Start
- Tunturi Classic
- Tunturi Sport
- Tunturi Super Sport
- Tunturi Trial
- Tunturi DX
- Tunturi Tiger
- Tunturi Tiger S
- Tunturi Tiger Air
- Tunturi Tiger Aqua
- Tunturi Hopper
- Tunturi Magnum X
- Tunturi City
- Tunturi "Lähetti"
- Tunturi Break

== Gallery ==
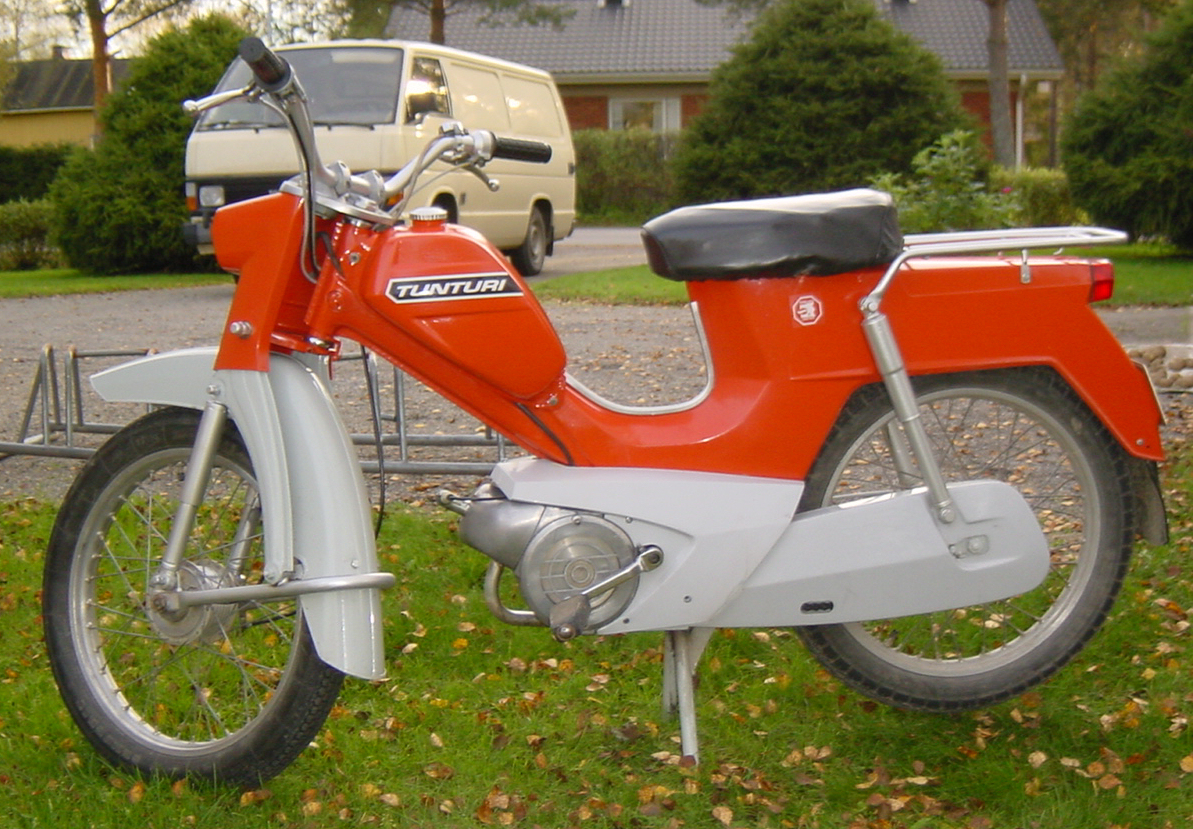
Red Pappa-Tunturi

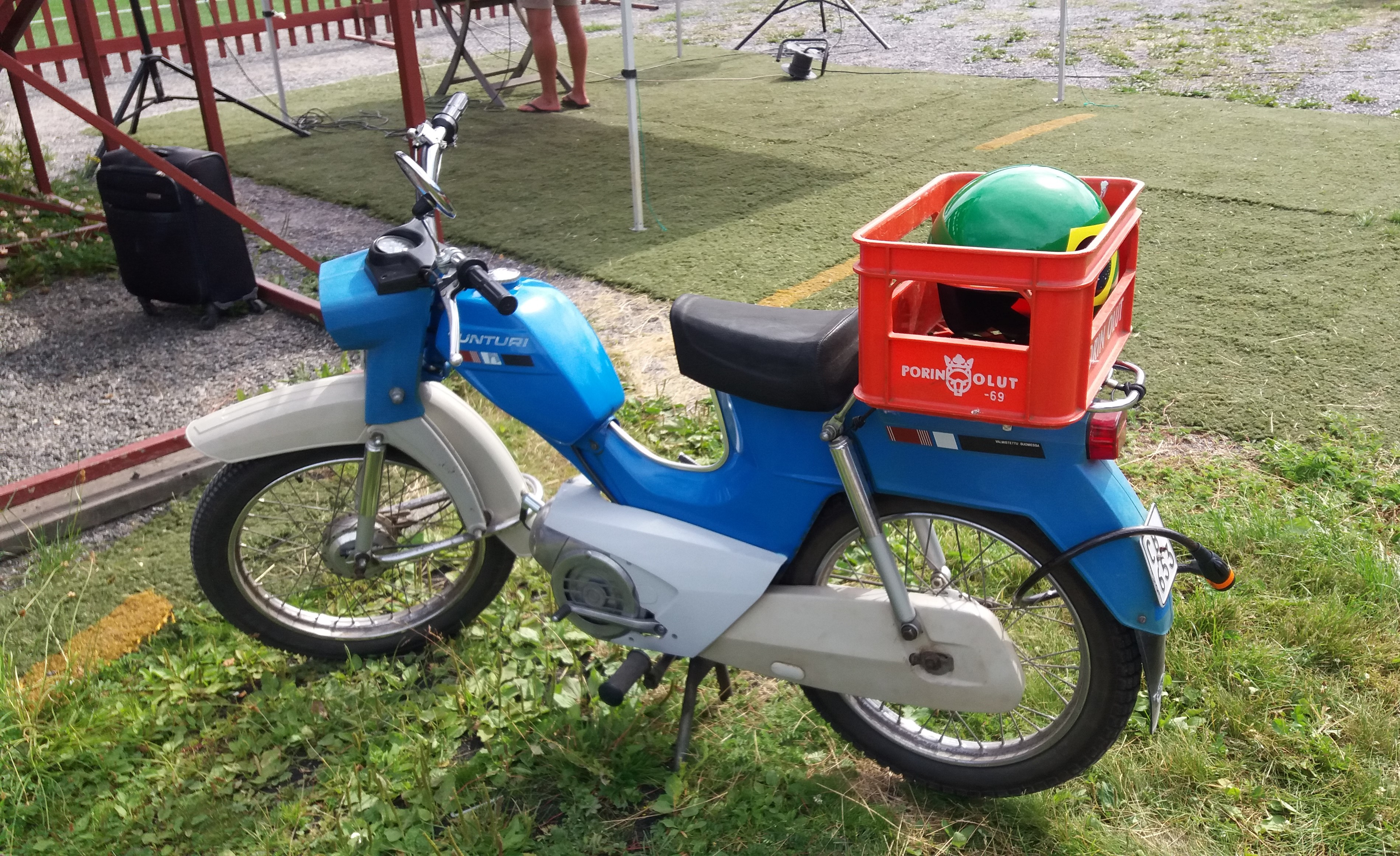
Blue Pappa-Tunturi

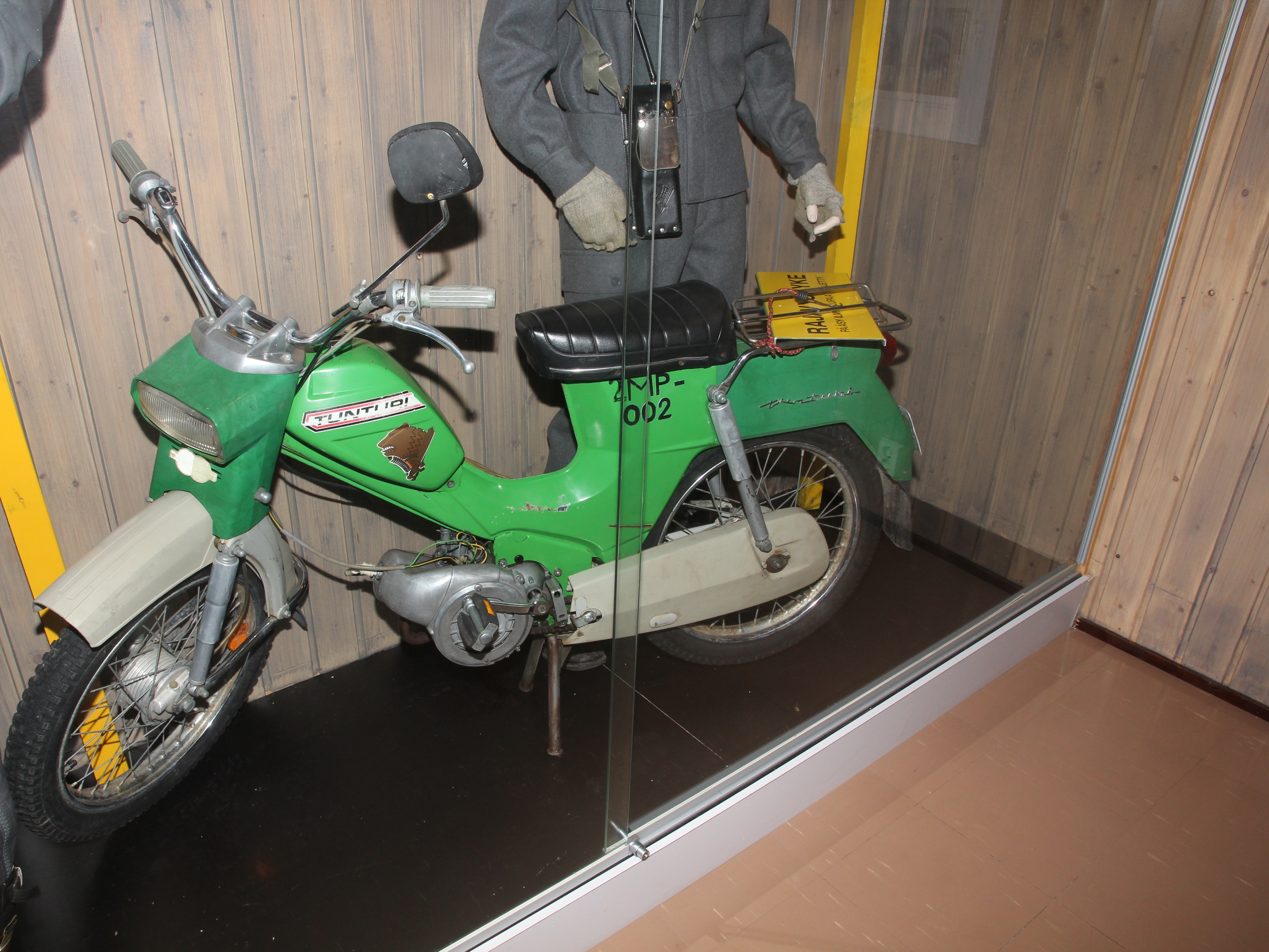
Tunturi moped used by Finnish Border Guard

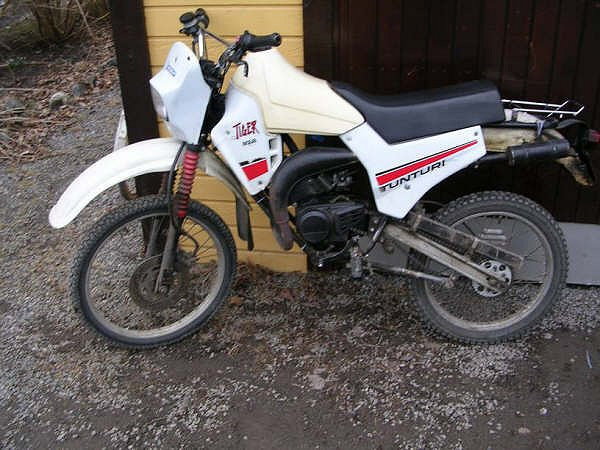
Tunturi Tiger Aqua

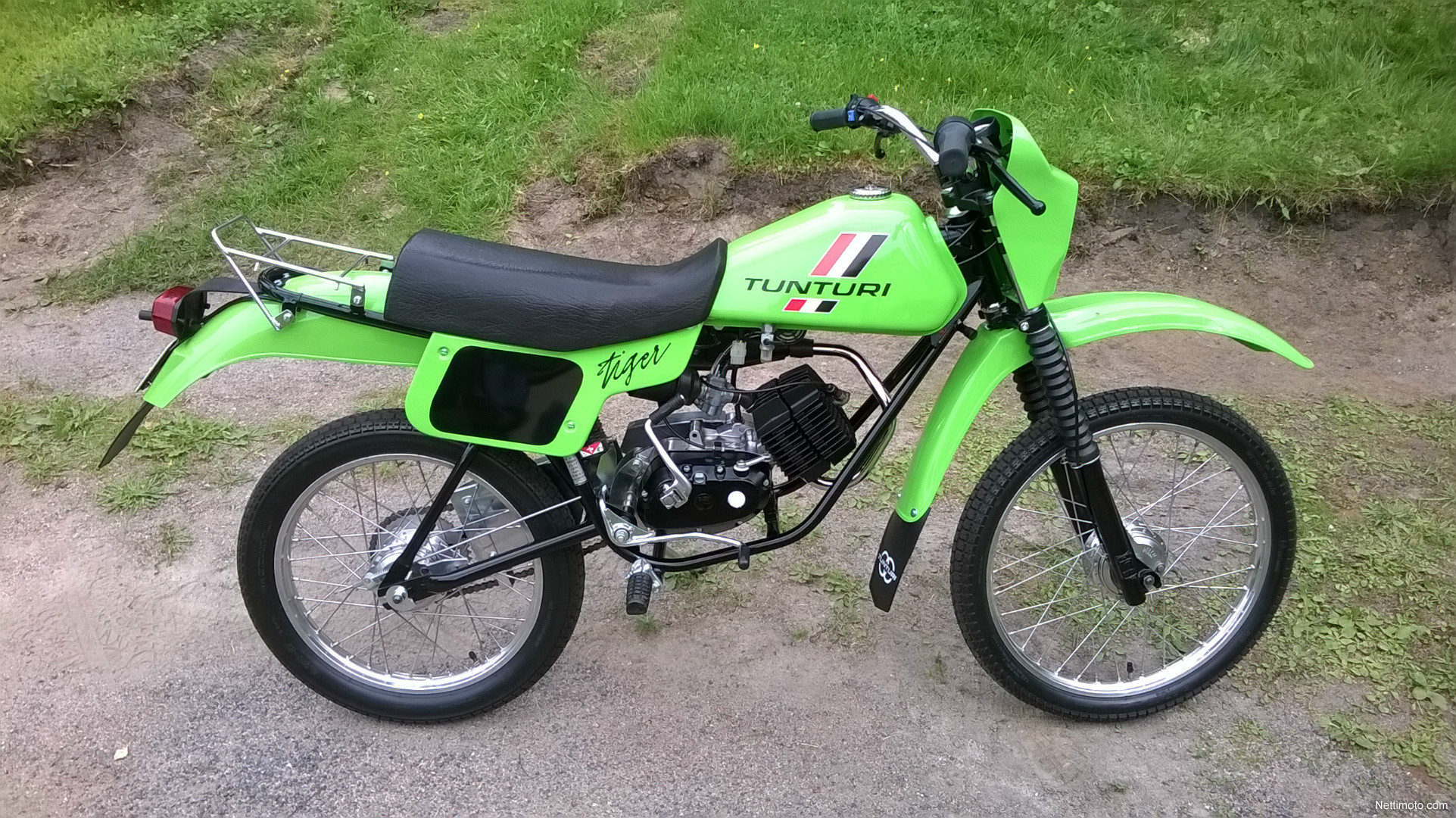
Tunturi Tiger

== See also ==
- Minibike
- Suzuki PV 50
