= Megasport =

Megasport may refer to:

- Megasport Sports Palace, a sports and entertainment facility in Moscow, Russia
- FC Megasport, a soccer team based in Almaty, Kazakhstan
- Megasport, the former name of the Ukrainian television channel Mega
- Mega Sport, a sporting goods retailer in North Macedonia; see List of supermarket chains in North Macedonia

== See also ==
- Ultra sport (disambiguation)
- Super sport (disambiguation)
- Hypersport (disambiguation)
- Sport (disambiguation)
- Mega (disambiguation)
