= Sporting =

Sporting may refer to:

- Sport, recreational games and play
- Sporting (neighborhood), in Alexandria, Egypt

== Sports clubs ==
- Alexandria Sporting Club, a sports club from Alexandria, Egypt
- BFA Sporting, a football club from Beirut, Lebanon
- Real Sporting de Gijón, a football club from Gijón, Spain
- Sporting Al Riyadi Beirut, a sports club from Beirut, Lebanon
- Sporting BC, a Greek professional basketball team from Athens
- Sporting Charleroi, a football club from Charleroi, Belgium
- Sporting Clube da Brava, a football club from Cape Verde
- Sporting Clube da Covilhã, a sports club from Covilhã, Portugal
- Sporting Clube de Braga, a sports club from Braga, Portugal
- Sporting Clube de Goa, a sports club from Goa, India
- Sporting Clube de Portugal, a sports club from Lisbon, Portugal
- Sporting Cristal, a football club from Lima, Peru
- Sporting Kansas City, a soccer (football) club from Kansas City, Kansas, U.S.

== Former euphemisms ==
- Sporting man culture
- Gambling
- Prostitution
- Red-light district
