= Ultrasport (talk show) =

- Genre: Sports talk show
- Directed by: Detelina Boycheva
- Presented by: Stanimir Bakalov, Victoria Mladenova
- Country of origin: Bulgaria
- Original language: Bulgarian
- No. of seasons: 16

Production
- Running time: 60 min

Original release
- Release: March 22, 2000 – present

Ultrasport is a Bulgarian weekly television sports talk show broadcasting on Eurocom Sofia every Monday at 21:15 PM. Stanimir Bakalov and Victoria Mladenova are the presenters of the show. It has aired since March 2000.

== History ==
The first run of the show was on 22 March 2000. The first show with hosts Velizar Handjiev and Stanimir Bakalov was dedicated to the Eternal derby of Bulgarian football and the ultras of Levski Sofia and CSKA Sofia. Through the years, hosts and reporters in the show have included Ivo Tonkov, Ivaylo Angelov, Tsvetomir Lazarov, Nikoleta Madanska, Christian Krasteva and Denis Olegov.

In the past, the show has run a feature called "Eurocom visits...", which presents athletes in their everyday life.

The main topic in "Ultrasport" is the football 'ultras' culture.
