= Tunturi Super Sport =

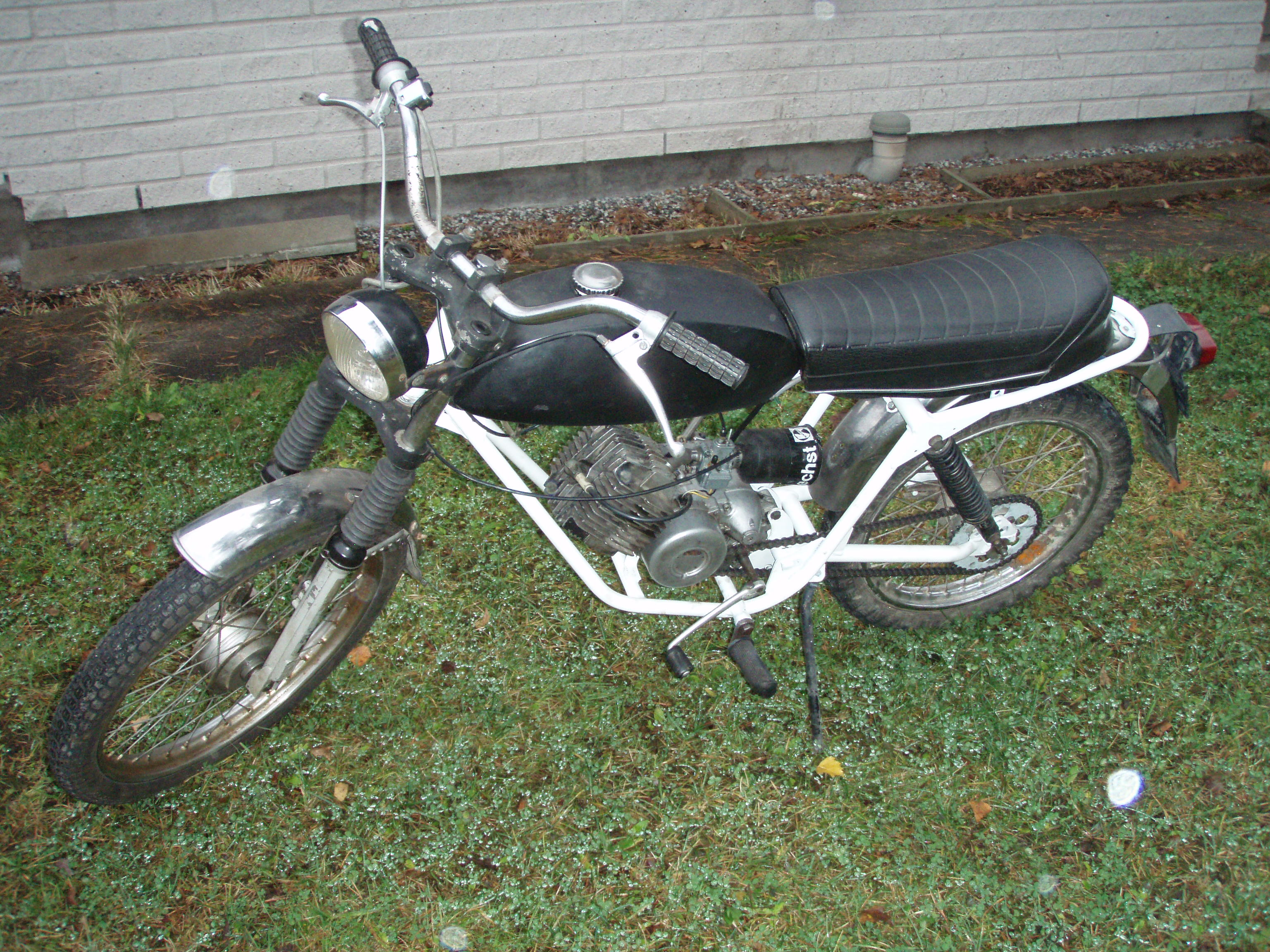
Tunturi Super Sport -82

Tunturi Super Sport was a model made by Tunturi. It replaced the old Tunturi Sport model. The engine was an air-cooled Puch VZ50 N4, producing 1.1 kW (approximately 1.5 HP) at 5,000 rpm. There was also 'street' version of Super Sport available known as Tunturi DX, differences being rectangular headlight and plastic panels under and behind the seat.

It was made 1977-1987 until Tunturi Tiger S replaced the model.

== Technical information ==
- engine: Puch VZ50N4
- engine type: 2-stroke
- displacement: 49 cm^{3}
- cylinder diameter: 38mm
- compression ratio: 8,5:1
- max power: 1,1 kW @ 5000 rpm
- carburetor: Bing 85/11/101
- fuel mix: 2,5%
- fuel tank capacity: 6,5l
- transmission: 4-speed
- clutch: wet multiple-disk
- voltage: 6v
- ignition system: magneto
- ignition advance: 2,0mm
- spark plug: Bosch W7AP
- span: 0,5 mm

Measurements

- length: 1850 mm
- wheelbase: 1230 mm
- clearance: 210 mm
- front tire: 2,25 x 19
- pressure: 2-2,25 bar
- rear tire: 2,75 x 17
- pressure: 2-2,25 bar
