= Speed Age =

American automobile magazine

Speed Age is a former American automobile magazine, which was based in Hyattsville, Maryland. The magazine was in circulation between May 1947 and December 1959. No issues were printed from January through May 1954. There were several "special" issues published. There were also at least two short lived attempts to resurrect Speed Age in later years.

According to Dean Batchelor, The American Hot Rod, Speed Age "knew a lot more about Indianapolis and NASCAR racing than they did about road racing, sports cars, or hot rods, and the publication did its best work when it stuck to its area of expertise".
