= Denis Olegov =

Bulgarian writer and journalist

- Денис Олегов Молодцов
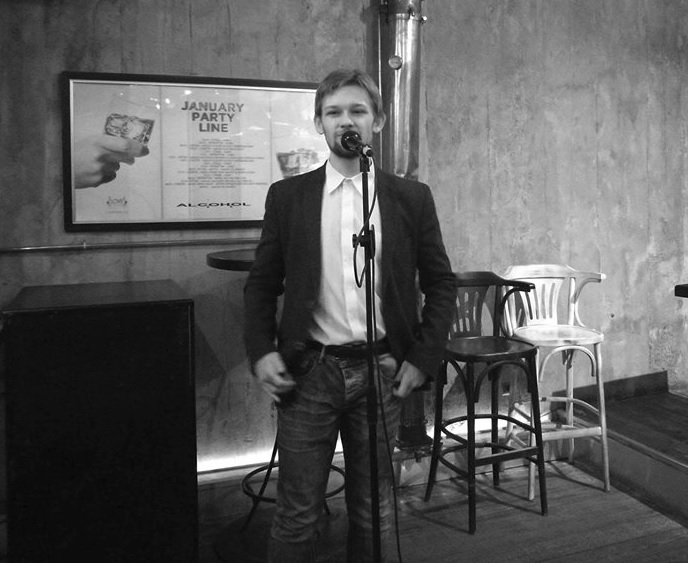
- Olegov hosts "2 years "Beyond the Cover", 2017.
- Born: Denis Olegov Molodtsov; 9 February 1998 (age 28); Sofia, Bulgaria
- Citizenship: Bulgaria
- Occupations: writer, journalist, blogger
- Writing career
- Language: Bulgarian
- Period: 2011 – present
- Genres: poetry, short story
- Website: olegovism.blogspot.bg

Denis Olegov Molodtsov (Bulgarian: Денис Олегов) is a Bulgarian writer and journalist of Russian descent. Olegov has authored five books with poems and prose, the most recent being "An eternal foreigner" (Bulgarian: Вечен чужденец).

== Biography ==
Denis Olegov Molodtsov was born on 9 February 1998 in Sofia, Bulgaria. At the age of 13, he began writing poems. His early works were published on the online page "Street of Dreams~". Furthermore, Olegov published his poems on several Bulgarian websites under the pseudonym "Akinfa".

In April 2014, Olegov released his first book, titled "Rimodraskanici", which is the name of the author's Facebook page. Later that year, he published his second work, "The Division Of A Soul" (Bulgarian: Раздвоението на една душа).

In 2015, Olegov began working for The Bulgarian television Eurocom Sofia, where he provided commentary on some football matches from Campeonato Brasileiro Série A alongside Stanimir Bakalov, Boyko Kotev, and Kristian Krasteva. At the same time, he was a reporter for Eurocom's sports show Ultrasport. Olegov has publications on Bulgarian websites Fanface, Gol, and Kafene.

In July 2015, the author received his first award for his poem "Roots", given to him for winning the poetic competition "Against the Wind" (Срещу вятъра). In November 2015, Olegov was awarded second place at the contest "Unknown Streets" (Непознати улици). Some of Olegov's works were published in the online compilation of Bulgarian literature "Manu Propria".

In the beginning of 2016, Olegov's poem "Love Writing" took first place at the contest "Golden Yavor" in the category "Under 20 y.o." On 13 January 2016, the author

== Bibliography ==
=== Solo ===
- "Rimodraskanici" (2014)
- "The split of the soul" (2014)
- "Ice and fire" (2016)
- "The wheel of the history" (2017)
- "An eternal foreigner" (2020)

=== Other ===
- "Manu propria vol. 3" (2015)
- "Black mirror" (2017) (with Todor Iliev)
- "Absent" (2017)
