= KZ Sport 1 =

Kazakh television sports channel

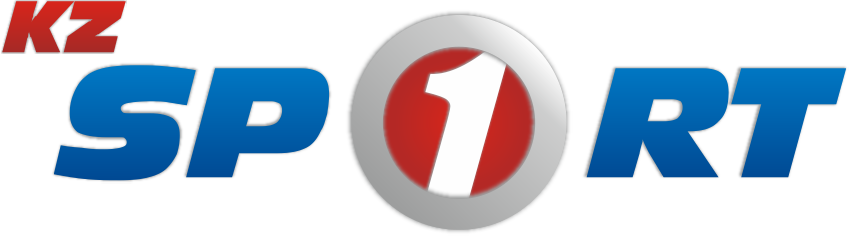
- Country: Kazakhstan
- Broadcast area: Kazakhstan

Programming
- Languages: Kazakh, Russian

History
- Launched: 12 December 2008

Links
- Website: www.kzsport1.kz

KZ Sport 1 — was first Kazakh 24/7, privately-owned sports TV channel, operating from 2008 to 2013 and owned by TOO "Sports Media Central Asia". The channel ceased operations in 2013.

== History ==
KZ Sport 1 was registered on 17 November 2008 and started broadcasting on December 12 of that year

- on November 17, 2008 — TV channel it was registered;
- on December 12, 2008 — in the capital of the Republic of Kazakhstan, in the city of Astana there passed TV channel presentation. As the leader sports commentator Gusev Victor Mikhaylovich was invited. The red tape was cut by the chairman of Committee on sports of the Ministry of tourism and sports of the Republic of Kazakhstan Kulnazarov Anatoly Kozhekenovich and the general director of KZ Sport TV channel 1 Lydia Kachelayeva;
- on November 16, 2012 — TV channel rebranding: logo replacement.

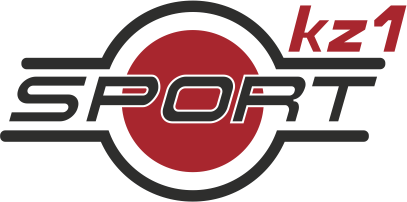
Old logo of the Kazakhstan sports TV channel KZ Sport 1.

== TV channel Tasks ==
- Sports promoting in the Republic of Kazakhstan, by translation of the Kazakhstan sporting events, and also sports events of world level;
- Translation of sporting events with participation of domestic athletes abroad;
- Involvement of citizens of the Republic of Kazakhstan to a healthy lifestyle;
- Development of mass sports among citizens of the Republic of Kazakhstan;
- Attraction of interest to child youthful sports from the state;
- Attraction of interest to the sports organizations developing sports for people with limited physical and intellectual possibilities;
- Production of own telecasts with participation of stars of sports;
- Integration into world cultural process and global information space;
- Interaction with the domestic, foreign and international companies and advertising agencies on a commercial basis: advertising, sponsorship of translations and sports events.

== Owners and management ==
General director — Lydia Kachelayeva

== Broadcasting ==
- The satellite broadcasting was carried out till July, 2012 by means of translation via the satellite "Yamal 201" at cooperation with the operator of services of satellite communication of Zharyk LLP.
- The cable broadcasting is carried out through a cable network "Alma TV".
- On-air broadcasting is carried out through a network of digital radio telecasting "OTAU TV", belonging to the national operator of radio and satellite TV and radio broadcasting of the Republic of Kazakhstan of joint stock company "Kazteleradio".

== Translation ==
Football:
- English Premier League 2008—2009
- Scottish Premier League 2008—2009
- English Premier League 2010—2011
- Scottish Premier League 2011—2012
- Ukrainian Premier League 2009—2010
- Russian Premier League 2010—2011
- Spanish Premier League 2011—2012
- Commonwealth of Independent States Cup 2009
- Coppa Italia 2010
- UEFA Euro 2012 qualifying (Kazakh team matches)
- 2012 Copa del Rey Final 2012
- Russian Cup 2012
- Liga ZON Sagres 2012 - 2013
- Swiss Super League 2012 - 2013
- Kazakhstan national football team
- HSV All stars — Zidane & Friends 2011

Hockey:

- КHL 2009 — 2010
- Кубок Базеля 2010
- 2010 IIHF World Championship (including all Kazakh team matches)
- 2012 IIHF World Championship

Volleyball:

- Top Volley International Basel 2011
- AVC Asian Women's Club Championships 2012
- AVC Continental Cup Beach Volleyball 2012
- AVC Asian Men's Club Volleyball Championship 2012
- Boris Yeltsin Nat Team Cup 2012

Basketball:

- Kazakhstan Cup 2012
- FIBA Stankovic Continental Cup 2012

Handball:

- DHB Handball Supercup 2011

Box:

- Klitschko's fights
- Gennady Golovkin vs Grzegorz Proksa WBC
- Kazakh boxers fighting

Judo:

- IJF Grand Slam Tokyo 2011

Mix fights:

- Rumble of the Kings 2011

ATP:
- BNP Paribas Open 2010
- Sony Ericsson Open 2010
- Monte-Carlo Rolex Masters 2010
- Mutua Madrid Open 2010
- Internazionali BNL d’Italia 2010
- Rogers Cup 2010
- Western & Southern Open 2010
- Shanghai Rolex Masters 2010
- Итоговый турнир 2010
- Heineken Open 2012
- Brasil Open 2012
- Open 13 2012
- BRD Nastase Tiriac Trophy 2012
- BMW Open 2012
- ATP World Team Cup 2012
- Gerry Weber Open 2012
- UNICEF Open 2012
- SkiStar Swedish Open 2012
- Mercedes Cup 2012

WTA:

- ASB Classic 2012
- PTT Pattaya Open 2012
- Whirlpool Monterrey Open 2012
- BMW Malaysian open 2012
- Barcelona Ladies Open 2012
- Sony Ericsson Open Copenhagen 2012
- Budapest Grand Prix 2012
- NÜRNBERGER Gastein Ladies 2012
- UNICEF Open 2012
- Collector Swedish Open 2012
- Baku Cup 2012

Table tennis:

- Asian Table Tennis Championships 2012
- ATTU Asian Cup 2012
- Olympic Qualification Table Tennis (Asian Zone) 2012

Triathlon:

- ITU World Triathlon Series 2012

Athletics:
- Indoor Athletics Five Nations Meeting 2012
- IAAF Grand Prix 2012
- USA vs World at Penn Relays 2012
- IAAF Indoor Grand Prix 2012
- IAAF World Challenge League 2012
- Tokyo Marathon 2012
- Maratona di Roma 2012
- Rotterdam Marathon 2012
- Boston marathon 2012
- Prague Marathon 2012
- Stockholm Marathon 2012

Swimming:

- AT&T Winter Championships 2011
- USA Swimming Grand Prix Grand Prix 2012
- Mare Nostrum 2012

Diving:

- FINA Diving World Series 2012
- FINA Diving Grand Prix 2012

Water polo:

- FINA Water Polo World League for Women 2012

Ski marafon:

- Ski Classics 2012

Gymnastics:

- FIG World Cup Artistic 2012

Rugby:

- Asian Five Nations 2012
- Chartis Cup International 2012

Motorsport:

- Формула 1 2010
- Race of Champion 2011

Cycling:

- Tour de Suisse 2010

=== Transfers ===
The "All-terrain vehicle" serialized television program (Broadcast time on KZ Sport 1 TV channel: Environment 20:00, Friday 14:00)

The Vezdekhod magazine covers not only off-road sports, but also a wide variety of activities outside the routine pace of everyday life. Its topics include extreme and active forms of recreation, unusual automobile journeys to unfamiliar countries, expeditions with hunting and fisheries inspectors, the involvement of off-road enthusiasts in environmental projects, activities of road-car fan clubs, interviews with respected figures in the field, and reviews of vehicles and equipment used for these activities.

== Partners ==
KZ Sport 1 TV channel, cooperates with such media holdings, as «Sport Five», «ASN», «IEC in Sports», «Orange», «AMI», «UFO Sport», "KHL-marketing", «Team Marketing», «IMG», «NTV +».

== Development prospects ==
- Creation of an official site www.kzsport1.kz;
- The on-line Organization of translation of TV channel on a site www.kzsport1.kz;
- Transition to a broadcasting in a HD format;
- The beginning of a broadcasting of TV channel by means of a mobile network 4G;
- KZ Sport 2 TV channel Creation.
