= Supercar (disambiguation) =

Supercar or variant may refer to:

- Supercar, a sports car, whose performance is highly superior to its contemporaries
- Supercar (band), Japanese rock band
- Supercar (TV series), a children's TV show produced by Gerry Anderson, and subsequently adapted as a comic strip
- Knight Rider (1982 TV series) was marketed as Supercar in Italy
- Supercars Championship, an Australian touring car racing category
- Le Supercar, an electric car model from LeEco
- Super Cars (1990 videogame) aka "Super Cars I", a Gremlin Interactive video game
- Super Cars II (1991 videogame), a Gremlin Interactive video game
- Maruzensky, a Japanese racehorse nicknamed "Supercar."

== See also ==
- Super (disambiguation)
- Car (disambiguation)
- Hypercar (disambiguation)
- Muscle car
