= Hypercar =

Hypercar may refer to:

- Hypercar (concept car)
- Hypercar (car classification), a high-performance supercar
- Racing class in the FIA World Endurance Championship, includes:
  - Le Mans Hypercar, type of sports racing car

== See also ==
- Hyper (disambiguation)
- Car (disambiguation)
- Supercar (disambiguation)
- Muscle car
