= Sport1 =

Sport1 may refer to the following TV channels:

- Sport1 (Eastern Europe)
- Sport1 (Germany)
- Sport1 (Lithuania)
- Sport1 (Netherlands), now Ziggo Sport Totaal
- Sport 1 (Russian TV channel), now Match! Arena
