= Chevrolet Corvette Super Sport =

Overview
- Manufacturer: Chevrolet (General Motors)
- Production: 1956
- Model years: 1957

Body and chassis
- Class: Sports car
- Body style: Roadster
- Layout: F/R
- Platform: Chevrolet Corvette (C1)

Powertrain
- Engine: 283 cu in (4.6 L) V8
- Transmission: 3-speed manual

Dimensions
- Wheelbase: 102 in (2,591 mm)

The Chevrolet Corvette Super Sport is a one-off show car built by the Chevrolet division of General Motors (GM). Described as a 1957 model, it was first shown in December 1956 in New York City.

== History ==
The car that became the Corvette Super Sport began as a regular production 1956 C1 Corvette with Vehicle Identification Number (VIN) E56S001589. With original equipment including a 265 cu in (4.3 L) Chevrolet small-block V8 engine, power windows and a hydraulic folding top, the car was a display model in the GM Building in Detroit. Starting on 26 April and finishing 28 June 1956 the car underwent a cosmetic upgrade, after which it went back on display.

At some time after this Shop Order #90181 was issued to build the Corvette Super Sport, and the display car was selected to form the basis of the new project. The car was sent to the Styling Department, where the changes took place. The conversion cost $18,000 ($208,179 in 2024 dollars).

To make the Super Sport a 1957 model year car, it was assigned a new custom VIN that was a hybrid of 1956 and 1957 model year formats. Regular 1956 model car VINs started at E56S001001, where the "56" represented the year, while regular 1957 model year cars started at E57S101001, where the year field was updated to "57", and the first digit following the "S" was a "1". The VIN assigned to the Super Sport was E57S001589, retaining the last four digits of the donor car's original VIN.

The Super Sport was first shown in New York city at the Waldorf Astoria Auto Show in December 1956. It also appeared at the Chicago Auto Show that same year. The car was featured on the cover of the June 1957 issue of Speed Age magazine.

After appearing at car shows and returning to GM, the car was eventually sent to Chevrolet dealer Dick Doane Motors in Dundee, Illinois. From there it was bought by Ralph Poole Auto Sales of Albuquerque, New Mexico, and subsequently sold to a private owner in Albuquerque. Around 1960 the car was being raced at an illegal drag strip when it struck a telephone pole and suffered body damage. After the accident the car was relegated to a local junkyard, where it remained until being bought some time later by Albuquerque local Bill Hovey, who kept the unrestored car until 1997. At some point ownership of the car was in dispute. John Baldwin acquired the Super Sport wreck from Hovey, and began restoring the car.

Following a complete restoration, the car appeared at the 2017 Amelia Island Concours d'Elegance on 12 March 2017 in Fernandina Beach, Florida.

The Corvette Super Sport was listed for sale at the 2022 Mecum Kissimmee auction, but was withdrawn.

== Features ==
To create the Super Sport, the original car's windshield, door glass, and windshield wipers were removed. The door top openings were closed by custom covers, and the body side coves had anodized aluminum panels fitted. The trailing end of the side coves had non-functional air scoops added. This feature was inspired by the two earlier SR-2 racing Corvettes; one built for Harley Earl's son Jerry, and one built for Bill Mitchell. Special taillamps were created for the car.

On the interior, the floor panels were first covered with plywood and then anodized aluminum panels over that. Custom footrests were built. The instrument cluster and center console were redesigned, and the driveline tunnel got a custom cover. The door panels were unique to the car, and a tachometer was mounted on the steering column. The full-width windshield was replaced by two individual bubble windscreens also inspired by the SR-2s. This was the first Corvette to have a blue interior, the first to have leather seating, and the first to have interior cupholders.

The original V8 engine was replaced by a new small-block V8 enlarged to 283 cu in (4.6 L). The engine was fitted with a Ramjet fuel injection system from Rochester, the first GM engine shown to the public with injection, and a preview of the system that would debut on production Chevrolets that year. The injection plenum was polished, and the engine also had chrome-plated aluminum valve covers, horn relay, voltage regulator covers and oil and radiator caps. The transmission was a 3-speed manual.

The car rode on special US Royal XP-140 thin-stripe whitewall tires.
