= Sport (disambiguation) =

Sport is an organised or unorganised recreation.

Sport or sports may also refer to:

== Teams ==
- Sport Boys, a Peruvian football team
- Sport Club do Recife, a Brazilian football team
- Vaasan Sport, a Finnish ice hockey team commonly known as Sport

== Periodicals ==
- Sport (American magazine)
- Sport (British magazine)
- Sport (New Zealand magazine)
- Sport (Spanish newspaper)
- DSL Sport, a Serbian newspaper
- Sport Newspapers, an English publishing firm responsible for The Daily Sport, Sunday Sport and several "lads'" magazines
- The Sport (Adelaide newspaper) (1910–1948), a sporting and general interest weekly in South Australia

== Biology ==
- Sport (botany), a part of a plant that shows morphological differences from the rest of the plant, typically as a result of somatic mutation
  - Fern sports were widely collected
- Sport, a macromutation, traditionally called a sport, notably by Charles Darwin

== Music ==
=== Groups and labels ===
- Remember Sports, an indie rock band from Ohio known from 2014 to 2017 as Sports
- The Sports, an Australian rock band

=== Albums ===
- Sports (Bill Cosby album), an album by Bill Cosby
- Sports (Huey Lewis and the News album), an album by Huey Lewis and the News
- Sports (Modern Baseball album), an album by Modern Baseball
- Sports (Tokyo Incidents album), an album by Tokyo Incidents
- S.P.O.R.T.S., an album by T-Square

=== Songs ===
- Sports (song), a song by Viagra Boys

== Media ==
=== Television channels ===
- 1Sports, a defunct Indian television channel
- AFN Sports, a television channel of the American Forces Network
  - AFN Sports 2, a television channel of the American Forces Network
- C7 Sport, a defunct Australian television channel
- ČT Sport, a Czech television channel
- ERT2 Sport, a Greek television channel
- J Sports, a network of Japanese television channels
- KZ Sport 1, a defunct Kazakhstani television channel
- M4 Sport, a Hungarian television channel
- Match! Arena, a Russian high-definition television channel in 2010–2016 operated by VGTRK and acquired by Gazprom-Media
- Match! Game, formerly known as Sport-2, a Russian television channel in 2012–2016 operated by VGTRK and acquired by Gazprom-Media
- MBC Sports+, a South Korean television channel
- NTV Plus Sport (launched in 1996), a defunct Russian television channel in 1996–2016
- One Sports (TV channel), an Philippine television channel
  - One Sports+
- ORF Sport +, an Austrian television channel
- Rai Sport, an Italian television channel
  - Rai Sport 2, a defunct Italian television channel
- Russia-2 Sport (launched in 2003), alternatively known as RTR-Sport, a defunct Russian television channel in 2003–2009 operated by VGTRK
- Premier Sports (Philippine TV channel), a network of Philippine television channels
- RTM Sports, the former name of Malaysian television channel Sukan RTM
- SABC Sport, a South African television channel
- SCN Sportcanal, a defunct Portuguese television channel
- Solar Sports, a Philippine television channel
- Šport (TV channel), a Slovak television channel
- Sport (Turkmen TV channel)
- Sport 7, a defunct Dutch television channel
- Sports Channel (Israel)
- TAP Sports, a Philippine television channel
- TV 2 Sport (Danish TV channel), a Danish television channel
  - TV 2 Sport X, a Danish television channel
  - TV 2 Sport HD, a defunct Danish television channel
- TV 2 Sport (Norway)
- TVNZ Sport Extra, a defunct New Zealand television channel
- TVP Sport, a Polish television channel
- TVR Sport, a Romanian television channel
- TVRI Sport, an Indonesian television channel

=== Brands ===
- 10 Sport
- ABC Sport
- ABS-CBN Sports
- BBC Sport
- CBC Sports
- CBS Sports
- Fox Sports
- ITV Sport
- NBC Sports
- NRK Sport
- One Sports
- RTÉ Sport
- Seven Sport
- Sky Sports
- TVNZ Sport
- USA Sports
  - USA Sports (1977–2007)
  - USA Sports (2025–present)

=== Radio stations ===
- BBC Radio 5 Sports Extra, a British radio station
- Talksport, a British radio station

=== Television shows and episodes ===
- das aktuelle sportstudio, a German sports television program
- "Sport", the third episode of ChuckleVision
- Sportschau, a German sports television program
- SportsCenter, an American sports news television program

== Other uses ==
- Sport (Antwerp premetro station), a railway station in Antwerp, Belgium
- Sport (camera), a Soviet 35 mm SLR camera launched in 1937
- Sport (tug), an American tugboat wrecked on Lake Huron in 1920
- Sport, a trim for motor vehicles (See List of sports cars#Sport Trims)
- Airwave Sport, an Austrian paraglider design
- Sky Polarization Observatory (SPOrt), a cancelled Italian space observatory
- Sportcoat or sports coat, a type of jacket that originated for men's wear in shooting, among other outdoor sports
- Toyota Sports, Toyota Sports 800, Toyota Sports EV, vehicles made by Toyota
- Wii Sports, a 2006 Nintendo Wii video game
- Nintendo Switch Sports, a 2022 Nintendo Switch video game

== See also ==
- Water sport
- Sport1
- Sporting
- Sportsman
