= Hyperion =

Hyperion may refer to:

== Greek mythology ==
- Hyperion (mythology), a list of figures in Greek mythology, including:
  - Hyperion (Titan), one of the twelve Titans
  - Hyperion, an epithet of Helios

== Fiction ==
=== Literary Works ===
- Hyperion (Hölderlin novel) by Friedrich Hölderlin (1799)
- Hyperion (Longfellow novel) by Henry Wadsworth Longfellow (1839)
- Hyperion (Simmons novel) by Dan Simmons (1989)
  - Hyperion Cantos, the series of novels that started with Hyperion
- Hyperion (poem) by John Keats (1819)
- Hyperion (magazine), a 1908–1910 German literary journal
- Hyperion (character), the name of several characters in the Marvel Comics universe

=== Fictional entities ===
==== Books ====
- Hyperion, an airship in the novel Skybreaker
- Hyperion, the flagship of Yang Wenli, a Legend of the Galactic Heroes character

==== Games ====
- Hyperion, the flagship of Jim Raynor in StarCraft
- Hyperion Corporation, an organization in the Borderlands series
- Hyperion, a Gallente battleship in Eve Online
- Hyperion UCS Mk.XII, a military satellite from Einhänder
- Hyperion, Seifer Almasy's weapon in Final Fantasy VIII
- Ark Hyperion, one of the four Ark starships in Mass Effect: Andromeda
- Hyperion, a fictional boss in the video game Returnal
- Hyperion, a powerful refined Necron's Blade variant in Hypixel SkyBlock

==== Television ====
- Hyperion, an airship in the film The Island at the Top of the World
- Hyperion, a ship in the TV series Skyland
- Emperor Hyperion, chief of the alien villains' race in the anime series Gekiganger III
- Hyperion Hotel, a fictional home base for Angel in the television series Angel
- Hyperion Class Heavy Cruiser, a class of warship used by the Earth Alliance in J. Michael Straczynski's Babylon 5

== Science ==
- Hyperion (moon), a moon of the planet Saturn
- Hyperion (beetle), a genus of beetles in the family Carabidae
- Hyperion (tree), a coast redwood in Northern California and the world's tallest known living tree
- Hyperion proto-supercluster, a supercluster of galaxy groups discovered in 2018
- Project Hyperion (interstellar), preliminary study of a crewed interstellar starship or generation ship

== Technology ==
- Hyperion (computer), an early portable computer
- Hyperion, a RuneScape emulator by Graham Edgecombe
- Hyperion, a hyperspectral imaging spectrometer on the NASA Earth Observing-1 satellite
- Hyperion, Disney's rendering system first used for Big Hero 6 (film)
- Nvidia Drive Hyperion, a series of semiconductor related evaluation board and software bundles for high end automotive computation purposes

== Music ==
- Hyperion (Gesaffelstein album), or the title song (2019)
- Hyperion (Manticora album) (2002)
- Hyperion (Marilyn Crispell, Peter Brötzmann and Hamid Drake album), or the title song (1995)
- Hyperion (EP) by Krallice, or the title song (2016)
- Hyperion, an album by St. Lucia (2018)
- "Hyperion" by McFly from The Lost Songs (2020)

== Businesses and organizations ==
- Hachette Books, a book publishing division known until 2014 as Hyperion Books
- Hyperion Books for Children, a book publisher
- Hyperion Press, a defunct publishing company
- Hyperion Entertainment, a computer game producer
- Hyperion Pictures, a film production company
- Hyperion Records, an independent British classical music label
- Hyperion Theatricals, part of Disney Theatrical Group
- Hyperion Power Generation, a nuclear power company
- Oracle Hyperion (Hyperion Solutions), a business software company owned by Oracle

== Places and facilities ==
- Hyperion, California, a stop on the Redondo Beach via Playa del Rey Line
- Hyperion Theater, a theater at the Disney California Adventure theme park
- Hyperion Water Reclamation Plant, a sewage treatment plant in Playa del Rey, California
- Hyperion Towers (or Mok-dong Hyperion Towers), Seoul, South Korea
- Hyperion Data Center, a planned data center in Louisiana

== Ships ==
- Hyperion (1810 ship), a commercial ship
- Hyperion (1814 ship), a commercial ship
- Hyperion (yacht), a large sloop launched in 1998
- HMS Hyperion, three ships of the British Royal Navy
- USS Hyperion (AK-107), a World War II US Navy cargo ship

== Other uses ==
- Hyperion, a sculpture by Angela Laich after the Friedrich Hölderlin novel
- Hyperion (horse) (1930–1960), a British Thoroughbred horse
- Hyperion (roller coaster), in Poland
- Hyperion, a version of the luxury car Rolls-Royce Phantom Drophead Coupé
- Hyperion XP-1, a hydrogen-powered "supercar" from Hyperion Motors

== See also ==
- Hyper (disambiguation)
- Hyperia (disambiguation)
