= Hyperion (ship) =

Several ships have been named Hyperion, after Hyperion, a figure from Greek mythology, or after Hyperion, one of Saturn's moons (discovered in 1848).

Ships with the name include:

== Commercial ships ==
- Hyperion (1810 ship), launched at Whitby in 1810. She made voyages to Canada, the Baltic, and India, and was wrecked in the Baltic in 1823.
- Hyperion (1814 ship), launched at Sunderland in 1814. She made one voyage for the British East India Company. Her crew abandoned her at sea in 1824.
- Hyperion Ray, launched 2015. She still carries vehicles, but was attacked during the Iran–Israel proxy conflict.
- Hyperion (yacht), built by Royal Huisman in 1998.

== Naval ships ==
- HMS Hyperion, three ships of the Royal Navy with the name
- USS Hyperion (AK-107), the only ship of the US Navy with the name

== See also ==
- Hyperion (disambiguation)
