= List of shipwrecks in June 1824 =

The list of shipwrecks in June 1824 includes some ships sunk, foundered, grounded, or otherwise lost during June 1824.

== 1 June ==
List of shipwrecks: 1 June 1824
Ship	State	Description
Arrow	United Kingdom	The sloop struck the La Bay Rock, off Grenville, Grenada and was wrecked. Her crew were rescued.
Cora	United Kingdom	The ship was driven ashore at Poverty Point, Bahamas. She was on a voyage from Marseille, Bouches-du-Rhône, France to Nassau, Bahamas.
Reparateur	France	The ship was lost near Cape Corrientes, Cuba. She was on a voyage from St. Jago de Cuba to Bordeaux, Gironde.
Eclipse	United Kingdom	The ship was wrecked near Cape Corrientes, Cuba with the loss of five of her crew. She was on a voyage from Jamaica to London.
Susan	United States	The schooner was wrecked at Ocracoke, North Carolina. She was on a voyage from Demerara to Philadelphia, Pennsylvania.

== 3 June ==
List of shipwrecks: 3 June 1824
Ship	State	Description
Joseph	United States	The ship was lost on the Little Bahama Bank. She was on a voyage from Mobile, Alabama to New York.
Margaret	United Kingdom	The ship ran aground on the English Bank, in the Atlantic Ocean off the coast of Argentina and was abandoned by her passengers and crew. She was subsequently driven ashore and wrecked in Santa Rosa Bay. Margaret was on a voyage from Liverpool, Lancashire to Buenos Aires, Argentina.
Phœnix	United Kingdom	The ship was in collision with Pilia (Sweden) in the English Channel and foundered. One crew member was thrown on board Pilia and survived. Phœnix was on a voyage from London to Carthagena, Spain.

== 4 June ==
List of shipwrecks: 4 June 1824
Ship	State	Description
William	United Kingdom	The ship was driven ashore and sank at Margate, Kent. She was on a voyage from London to Portsmouth, Hampshire.

== 5 June ==
List of shipwrecks: 5 June 1824
Ship	State	Description
John	United Kingdom	The ship was wrecked on the Butt of Lewis, Outer Hebrides. Her crew were rescued. She was on a voyage from Saint John, New Brunswick to Sunderland, County Durham.

== 6 June ==
List of shipwrecks: 6 June 1824
Ship	State	Description
Caroline	France	The ship was wrecked on La Folle Rock, off Aux Cayes, Haiti. She was on a voyage from Jacmel, Haitit of Havre de Grâce, Seine Maritime.
Jessie and Charlotte	United Kingdom	The ship was lost on Saaremaa, Russia. Her crew were rescued. She was on a voyage from Newcastle upon Tyne, Northumberland to Saint Petersburg, Russia.

== 8 June ==
List of shipwrecks: 8 June 1824
Ship	State	Description
Venus	United Kingdom	The ship was wrecked on Ura Island, Outer Hebrides. All on board were rescued. she was on a voyage from Lerwick, Shetland Islands to Liverpool, Lancashire.

== 9 June ==
List of shipwrecks: 9 June 1824
Ship	State	Description
Bacchus	United Kingdom	The ship sank in The Swin, off the coast of Essex.
New Century	United Kingdom	The ship was driven ashore on the coast of Campeche, Mexico.

== 10 June ==
List of shipwrecks: 10 June 1824
Ship	State	Description
Emma	Stettin	The ship struck a rock off "Rubeknadt", capsized and sank. She was on a voyage from Stettin to Amsterdam, North Holland, Netherlands.
James	United Kingdom	The ship was wrecked on Cape Sable Island, Nova Scotia, British North America. Her crew were rescued. She was on a voyage from Belfast, County Antrim to Quebec City, Lower Canada, British North America.
Nancy	United Kingdom	The ship ran aground on the Haisborough Sands, in the North Sea off the coast of Norfolk. Her crew survived. She was on a voyage from Memel, Prussia to London. She later floated off and was beached at Mundesley, Norfolk.
Thomas & Judith	United Kingdom	The smack struck the Golden Rock, in the River Suir and sank. All on board survived. She was on a voyage from Newport, Monmouthshire to Waterford.

== 11 June ==
List of shipwrecks: 11 June 1824
Ship	State	Description
Arab	United Kingdom	The whaler was abandoned in the Pacific Ocean. Her crew were rescued by Ocean (United Kingdom).
Lily	United Kingdom	The ship capsized off Copenhagen, Denmark. Her crew were rescued. She was on a voyage from Liebau, Prussia to Rochester, Kent.

== 12 June ==
List of shipwrecks: 12 June 1824
Ship	State	Description
Lily	United Kingdom	The ship was beached at Copenhagen. She was on a voyage from Sunderland, County Durham to Liebau, Prussia.
Margaret	United Kingdom	The ship, which had previously run aground on the English Bank, in the South Atlantic off Montevideo, Brazil, was wrecked on this date.
Minerva	United Kingdom	The ship was driven ashore and wrecked near the "Niddigen Lighthouse". Her crew were rescued. She was on a voyage from Danzig to Coleraine, County Antrim.
Post Captain	United States	The ship was driven ashore at Hampstead, New York. She was on a voyage from New York City to Bilbao, Spain. Post Captain had been refloated by 17 June.

== 14 June ==
List of shipwrecks: 14 June 1824
Ship	State	Description
Duke of Richmond	United Kingdom	The ship caught fire in the Irish Sea off Tarr Point, County Antrim and was beached. She was on a voyage from Liverpool, Lancashire to Londonderry.
Elizabeth	United Kingdom	The ship departed from Cork for Liverpool. She subsequently foundered in the Irish Sea off the Tuskar Rock.
Europa	United Kingdom	The ship was wrecked on the Caicos Keys. Her crew were rescued. She was on a voyage from Liverpool to Havana, Cuba.
Porcupine	United Kingdom	The ship was driven ashore in the River Thames near Greenwich, Kent and severely damaged. She was on a voyage from London to Lisbon, Portugal. Porcupine was later refloated.

== 15 June ==
List of shipwrecks: 15 June 1824
Ship	State	Description
Chance	United Kingdom	The ship was driven ashore at Shellness, Isle of Sheppey, Kent.
Janet	United Kingdom	The sloop was driven ashore and wrecked at North Berwick, Lothian with the loss of all four crew.

== 16 June ==
List of shipwrecks: 16 June 1824
Ship	State	Description
Harmonie	(Sweden) Norway	The ship was damaged beyond repair in an accident at Falmouth, Cornwall.

== 17 June ==
List of shipwrecks: 17 June 1824
Ship	State	Description
Jane	United Kingdom	The brig was wrecked at "Anegada de Feura". Her crew survived.
Robert & Mary	United Kingdom	The ship ran aground on the Spaniard Sand, in the Thames Estuary. She refloated but consequently sank off the Spaniard Sand. Her crew were rescued. She was on a voyage from Teignmouth, Devon to London Robert & Mary was later refloated. She was taken in to Whitstable, Kent on 30 June.

== 18 June ==
List of shipwrecks: 18 June 1824
Ship	State	Description
Glasgow	United Kingdom	The ship departed from Grimsby, Lincolnshire for North Shields, County Durham. No further trace, presumed foundered in the North Sea with the loss of all hands.

== 19 June ==
List of shipwrecks: 19 June 1824
Ship	State	Description
Alfred	United Kingdom	The ship was sunk on the Platter Sand, in the North Sea off Harwich, Essex. Her crew were rescued. She was on a voyage from Newcastle upon Tyne, Northumberland to Porto, Portugal. Alfred was refloated on 14 July and taken in to Harwich.

== 20 June ==
List of shipwrecks: 20 June 1824
Ship	State	Description
Amelie	France	The ship was driven ashore and wrecked near Padstow, Cornwall, United Kingdom. Her crew were rescued. She was on a voyage from Swansea, Glamorgan, United Kingdom to Rouen, Seine-Inférieure.

== 21 June ==
List of shipwrecks: 21 June 1824
Ship	State	Description
Delight	(United Kingdom of Great Britain and Ireland) Jamaica	The sloop was wrecked on a reef in the Black River. Her crew were rescued. She was on a voyage from Kingston to Savannah-la-Mar.

== 23 June ==
List of shipwrecks: 23 June 1824
Ship	State	Description
Morning Star	United Kingdom	The ship was destroyed by fire in the Bengal River.

== 25 June ==
List of shipwrecks: 25 June 1824
Ship	State	Description
Blucher	United Kingdom	The ship capsized at Peel, Isle of Man.

== 28 June ==
List of shipwrecks: 28 June 1824
Ship	State	Description
Hope	United Kingdom	The ship was driven ashore at Mazzara, Sicily. She was on a voyage from Palermo, Sicily to Gibraltar. Hope was refloated on 2 July and resumed her voyage.

== Unknown date ==
List of shipwrecks: Unknown date in June 1824
Ship	State	Description
Argo	United Kingdom	The ship foundered in the Atlantic Ocean with the loss of four of her crew. Chilton(United Kingdom).
Argus	Spain	The schooner was captured by Bolivar (Gran Colombian Navy) in early June. She was ordered in to Porto Caballo but was subsequently wrecked on Grand Bahama. Argus was on a voyage from Matanzas, Cuba to Havana, Cuba.
Dobson	United Kingdom	The ship was abandoned in the Atlantic Ocean before 25 May.
Dolphin	United Kingdom	The ship was driven ashore at Buffalo Point, India in early June.
Elise	Sweden	The ship was wrecked at Havre de Grâce, Seine-Inférieure, France.
Frederickstown	United Kingdom	The ship foundered in the Atlantic Ocean. Her crew were rescued by Collins (United Kingdom).
Friendship's Increase	United Kingdom	The smack was wrecked on the Gunfleet Sand, in the North Sea off the coast of Essex before 5 June. Her crew were rescued.
Hannibal	United States	The ship was struck by lightning, set afire and destroyed in the Atlantic Ocean.
Hyperion	United Kingdom	The ship was abandoned in the Atlantic Ocean. Her crew were rescued by Broderick (United Kingdom).
Hyperion	United States	The ship was wrecked in the Abaco Islands in early June. She was on a voyage from Baltimore, Maryland to Key West, Florida.
Jean	United Kingdom	The ship was abandoned in the Atlantic Ocean.
Martha	United Kingdom	The ship was abandoned in the Atlantic Ocean. Her crew were rescued.
Mary Ann	United Kingdom	The ship was wrecked off Amber Island. She was on a voyage from the Cape of Good Hope to Mauritius.
Scotia	(United Kingdom of Great Britain and Ireland) British North America	The brig was abandoned in the Atlantic Ocean. She was on a voyage from British Honduras to Dublin. Scotia was subsequently discovered at sea and taken in to Tenerife, Canary Islands in a waterlogged condition. She arrived on 24 December.
