= Meta =

Meta most commonly refers to:

- Meta (prefix), a common affix and word in English (lit. 'beyond' in Greek)
- Meta Platforms, an American multinational technology conglomerate (formerly Facebook, Inc.)

Meta or META may also refer to:

== Businesses ==
- Meta (academic company), performing analysis of scientific literature (2009–2022)
- Meta (augmented reality company), a maker of digital eyewear (2013–2019)
- Meta Linhas Aéreas, a Brazilian airline (1991–2011; formerly META)
- MetaBank, an American bank (founded 1954; now Pathward)

== Computing ==
- Meta element (<meta … >), an (X)HTML tag giving a webpage's metadata
- Metadata, data about data
- META II, a compiler-writing language
- Meta key, a modifier key on 1970s, 1980s workstations
- FF Meta, a typeface
- Metasequoia (software), a 3D graphics package
- Metaverse, social 3D virtual worlds
- Imagination META, a microprocessor
- Meta-Wiki, a co-ordinating Wikimedia wiki

== Entertainment ==
- Metagame, or meta, an approach to gaming outside prescribed rules
- Meta, a pole marking racetrack turns in a Roman circus
- Meta (Assemblage 23 album), 2007
- Meta (Car Bomb album), 2016
- Meta, a 2016 album by Thy Catafalque
- META, a 2023 album by PinocchioP

== People ==
- Meta (name), list of people with the given name or surname
- Pseudonym of contemporary artist Margaret Kilgallen (1967–2001)

== Places ==
=== Colombia ===
- Meta Department
- Meta River, an Orinoco tributary

=== Italy ===
- Meta, Campania, in Naples province
- Monti della Meta, an Apennine massif
  - Monte Meta (or La Meta), its main peak

=== United States ===
- Meta, Kentucky, an unincorporated community
- Meta, Missouri, a city

=== Elsewhere ===
- Meta (district), Oromia, Ethiopia
- 1050 Meta, a stony main-belt asteroid
- Meta River, a tributary of the Desna in Ukraine

== Science and technology ==
- Meta (chemistry), a nomenclature prefix for substituents or dehydration
- Meta (spider), a long-jawed orb-weaver genus
- 1050 Meta, a stony main-belt asteroid
- Megachannel ExtraTerrestrial Assay, a predecessor to the SETI project
- META fuel, a solid fuel

== Other uses ==
- Meta (mythology), first wife of Aegeus, mythical king of Athens
- Metaʼ language, spoken in Cameroon
- Middle East Theatre Academy, Sharjah, United Arab Emirates

== See also ==
- Mata (disambiguation)
- Metta (disambiguation)
- Metalanguage (disambiguation)
- Hyper (disambiguation)
- Super (disambiguation)
- Metanoia (theology)
- Metastasis, in medicine
