= The Super =

The Super may refer to:

- The Super (1991 film), an American comedy film
- The Super (2017 film), an American horror thriller film
- The Super (TV series), an American 1972 sitcom television series
- Building superintendent, or "the super"
- "The Super", a story from the graphic novel A Contract with God

== See also ==
- Super (disambiguation)
- El Super
