= Hyperspace (disambiguation) =

Hyperspace is a faster-than-light method of traveling used in science fiction.

Hyperspace or HyperSpace may also refer to:

== Mathematics ==
- Hypertopology, a topological space within which some of its elements form another topological space
- Higher dimensions, including Kaluza–Klein's 4-dimensional space and Superstring theory's 9-dimensional space and Supergravity/M-theory's 10-dimensional space
- n-dimensional space, the original meaning of the word hyperspace, common in late nineteenth century British books
- Non-Euclidean space

== Media ==
=== Books ===
- Hyperspace (book), a 1994 book by Michio Kaku that attempts to explain the possibility of 10-dimensional space using string theory
- Hyperspace (gamebook), a book in the Choose Your Own Adventure series

=== Film and television ===
- Hyperspace (film), a 1984 3D science fiction comedy film
- Hyperspace, the U.S. title of Space, a 2001 BBC documentary

=== Music ===
- Hyperspace, the opening song on the Nada Surf album The Proximity Effect
- Hyperspace, 2019 studio album by American producer and musician Beck
- Hyperspace, a song by Buckner & Garcia from the album Pac-Man Fever
- Hyperspace, a song by Paul Epworth from the 2020 album Voyager

== Other uses ==
- The hypertextual or architectural aspect of cyberspace
  - Lost in hyperspace
- HyperSpace (software), an operating system by Phoenix Technologies

== See also ==
- Hyper (disambiguation)
- Hiperspace, IBM High Performance Space
- Hyper Scape
