= Super Tiger =

Super Tiger may refer to:

- Satoru Sayama (born 1957; Japanese: 佐山 聡, romanized: Sayama Satoru; ring name: "Super Tiger"), Japanese pro-wrestler and mixed-martial-artist
- Yuji Sakuragi (born 1977; Japanese: 桜木裕司, romanized: Sakuragi Yūji; ring names: "Super Tiger" and "Super Tiger II"), Japanese mixed-martial-artist and pro-wrestler
- Grumman F11F-1F "Super Tiger", a U.S. Navy jet fighter plane
- Northrop F-5ST "Super Tiger", a Thai variant of the U.S. F-5 Freedom Fighter export jet fighter

== See also ==
- Super (disambiguation)
- Tiger (disambiguation)
