= Super =

Super may refer to:

== Arts and entertainment ==
- Superhero, a type of character who typically possesses superpowers or abilities beyond those of ordinary people

=== Film ===
- Super (2005 film), a Telugu film starring Nagarjuna, Anushka Shetty and Ayesha Takia
- Super (2010 Indian film), a Kannada language film starring Upendra and Nayantara
- Super (2010 American film), a film written and directed by James Gunn, and starring Rainn Wilson and Elliot Page

=== Music ===
- Super (Jão album), 2023
- Super (Pet Shop Boys album), 2016
- "Super" (Cordae song), 2021
- "Super" (Neu! song), 1972
- "Super" (Seventeen song), 2023
- "Super (1, 2, 3)", a 2000 song by Gigi D'Agostino

=== Television ===
- "Super" (Person of Interest), an episode of the TV series Person of Interest
- Dragon Ball Super, a Japanese animated television series
- Super Dragon Ball Z
- Super Shiro, a 2019 original net animation series

== Computing ==
- SUPER (computer program), or Simplified Universal Player Encoder & Renderer, a video converter/player
- Super (computer science), a keyword in object-oriented programming languages
- Super key (keyboard button)

== Brands and organizations ==
- Super (company), film distributor
- Super.com, an American technology company

=== Networks ===
- Super!, an Italian television network
- Super Radyo, a Philippine AM radio network owned by GMA Network Inc.
- NRK Super, a Norwegian children's television channel and radio station
- Superchannel, the former name of Canadian television channel Movie Central
- Super Channel (later NBC Super Channel), the former name of pan-European television channel NBC Europe
- Super Channel (Canadian TV channel)
- Super Hungama, an Indian children's television channel
- Super RTL, a German television channel

== People ==
- Hillary Super, American business executive
- Súper, a Spanish professional footballer
- Super (gamer) (born 2000), professional Overwatch player
- Zab Judah or Super, American boxer

== Transportation ==
- Buick Super, American automobile
- Super, a wake turbulence category for separating aircraft in flight
- Supertanker, a type of oil tanker ship

== Other uses ==
- Any of various positions called "superintendent", including
  - Building superintendent, a manager, maintenance or repair person, custodian, or janitor
- Superannuation, or pension
  - Superannuation in Australia
- Supernumerary actor, the stage equivalent of an extra in film
- Suomen lähi- ja perushoitajaliitto or SuPer, Finnish Union of Practical Nurses
- .38 Super, a pistol cartridge
- The "Super", Teller's H-bomb idea, a thermonuclear fusion bomb ignited by a smaller fission bomb
- "Supers", term coined by Daniel Dennett to refer to those opposed to the Brights movement

== See also ==
- Honey super, the part of a commercial beehive that is used to collect honey
- Super unleaded, a grade of gasoline
- Superman, a DC Comics superhero character
- Superman (disambiguation)
- Extraordinary (disambiguation)
- Supra (disambiguation)
- Hyper (disambiguation)
- Meta (disambiguation)
