= Darkness with Tales to Tell =

Darkness with Tales To Tell

Studio album by Manticora
- Released: May 2, 2001
- Genres: Power metal; progressive metal
- Length: 61:44
- Label: Scarlet
- Producer: Jacob Hansen

Manticora chronology
Roots of Eternity (1999)	Darkness with Tales To Tell (2001)	Hyperion (2002)

Professional ratings
Review scores
Source	Rating
Lords of Metal	7/10 stars

Darkness with Tales To Tell (2001) is the second album by Danish power metal band Manticora.

== Track listing ==
1. "...From Far Beyond" – 0:39
2. "The Chance of Dying in a Dream" – 5:29
3. "Dynasty of Fear" – 4:45
4. "Dragon's Mist" – 8:57
5. "Felice" – 6:37
6. "The Nightfall War" – 5:28
7. "The Puzzle" – 6:11
8. "Critical Mass" – 5:03
9. "Lost Souls" – 6:01
10. "The Twilight Shadow" – 5:26
11. "Shadows with Tales to Tell" – 7:03
- Bonus Tracks
1. "Dead End Solution (Bonus Track)" - 5:51

== Personnel ==
Band

- Lars F. Larsen – Vocals
- Kasper Gram – Bass
- Flemming Schultz - Guitars
- Kristian Larsen - Guitars
- Mads Volf – Drums
- Jeppe Eg Jensen - Keyboards

Technical Staff

- Jacob Hansen - Producing, Mixing, Mastering
- Lars F. Larsen - Liner Notes
- Chris Kallias - Artwork & Layout
- Andy Horn - Re-mastering
