= Manticora (band) =

Danish heavy metal band

- Origin: Hvidovre, Denmark
- Genres: Progressive metal; power metal
- Years active: 1996–present
- Labels: ViciSolum Productions
- Members: Lars F. Larsen; Kristian Larsen; Kasper Gram; Stefan Johansson; Lawrence Dinamarca
- Website: manticora.dk

Manticora is a Danish power metal/progressive metal band from Hvidovre, formed in 1996 by Lars and Kristian Larsen. Their current label is Nightmare Records. Their lyrical content typically consists of literature, fantasy, and science fiction. Although they are considered to be a progressive power metal band, they do have an essence of thrash metal influence. Their newest album, Mycelium, was released on 26 January 2024 via Mighty Music.

== Band members ==
- Lars F. Larsen – vocals (1996–present)
- Kristian Larsen – guitar (1996–present)
- Kasper Gram – bass (2001–2013, 2019–present)
- Stefan Johansson – guitar (2013–present)
- Lawrence Dinamarca – drums (2017–present)

=== Former members ===
- Mads Volf – drums (1996–2016)
- Rene Nielsen – bass (1996–2001)
- Flemming Schultz – guitar (1998–2001)
- Jeppe Eg Jensen – keyboards (1998–2003)
- Martin Arendal – guitar (2001–2013)
- Sebastian Andersen – bass (2014–2019)

Timeline

== Discography ==
- Dead End Solution EP (1997)
- Roots of Eternity (1999)
- Darkness with Tales to Tell (2001)
- Hyperion (2002)
- 8 Deadly Sins (2004)
- The Black Circus Part 1: Letters (2006)
- The Black Circus Part 2: Disclosure (2007)
- Safe (2010)
- To Kill to Live to Kill (2018)
- To Live to Kill to Live (2020)
- Mycelium (2024)
