= Hyper =

Hyper may refer to:

== Arts and entertainment ==
- Hyper (2016 film), 2016 Indian Telugu film
- Hyper (2018 film), 2018 Indian Kannada film
- Hyper (magazine), an Australian video game magazine
- Hyper (TV channel), a Filipino sports channel
- Hyper+, a former Polish programming block on Teletoon+
- Eedo Rakam Aado Rakam, 2016 Indian Telugu film, titled Hyper in Hindi

== Mathematics ==
- Hypercube, the n-dimensional analogue of a square and a cube
- Hyperoperation, an arithmetic operation beyond exponentiation
- Hyperplane, a subspace whose dimension is one less than that of its ambient space
- Hypersphere, the set of points at a constant distance from a given point called its centre
- Hypersurface, a generalization of the concepts of hyperplane, plane curve, and surface
- Hyperstructure, an algebraic structure equipped with at least one multivalued operation
- Hyperbolic functions, analogues of trigonometric functions defined using the hyperbola rather than the circle

== Other uses ==
- DJ Hyper (born 1977), a British electronic musician
- Hyper key, a modifier key on the space-cadet keyboard
- Hyper engine, a hypothetical aircraft engine design
- Hyper Island, a Swedish educational company
- Europe Sails Hyper, an Austrian hang glider
- Xiaomi HyperOS

== See also ==
- Hyperspace (disambiguation)
- Hyperactivity, a state in which a person is abnormally excitable and exuberant
- Hyperia
- Hyperion
- Super (disambiguation)
- Meta (disambiguation)
