= Intrinsic low-dimensional manifold =

In chemical kinetics, an intrinsic low-dimensional manifold is a technique to simplify the study of reaction mechanisms using dynamical systems, first proposed in 1992.

The ILDM approach fixes a low dimensional surface which describes well the slow dynamics and assumes that after a short time the fast dynamics are less important and the system can be described in the lower-dimensional space.

== See also ==
- Intrinsic dimension
