= Hyperia =

Hyperia may refer to:

- Hyperia (crustacean), a genus of the order Amphipoda
- Hyperia (roller coaster), a roller coaster at Thorpe Park, England
- Amorgos, known as Yperia in ancient Greece, an island of the Cyclades
- Hyperia, in Greek mythology, a daughter of the river god Inachus

== See also ==
- Hyper
- Hyperion
