= Jenny's Adventure (1757) =

Sunken 18th-century British trawler and whaler

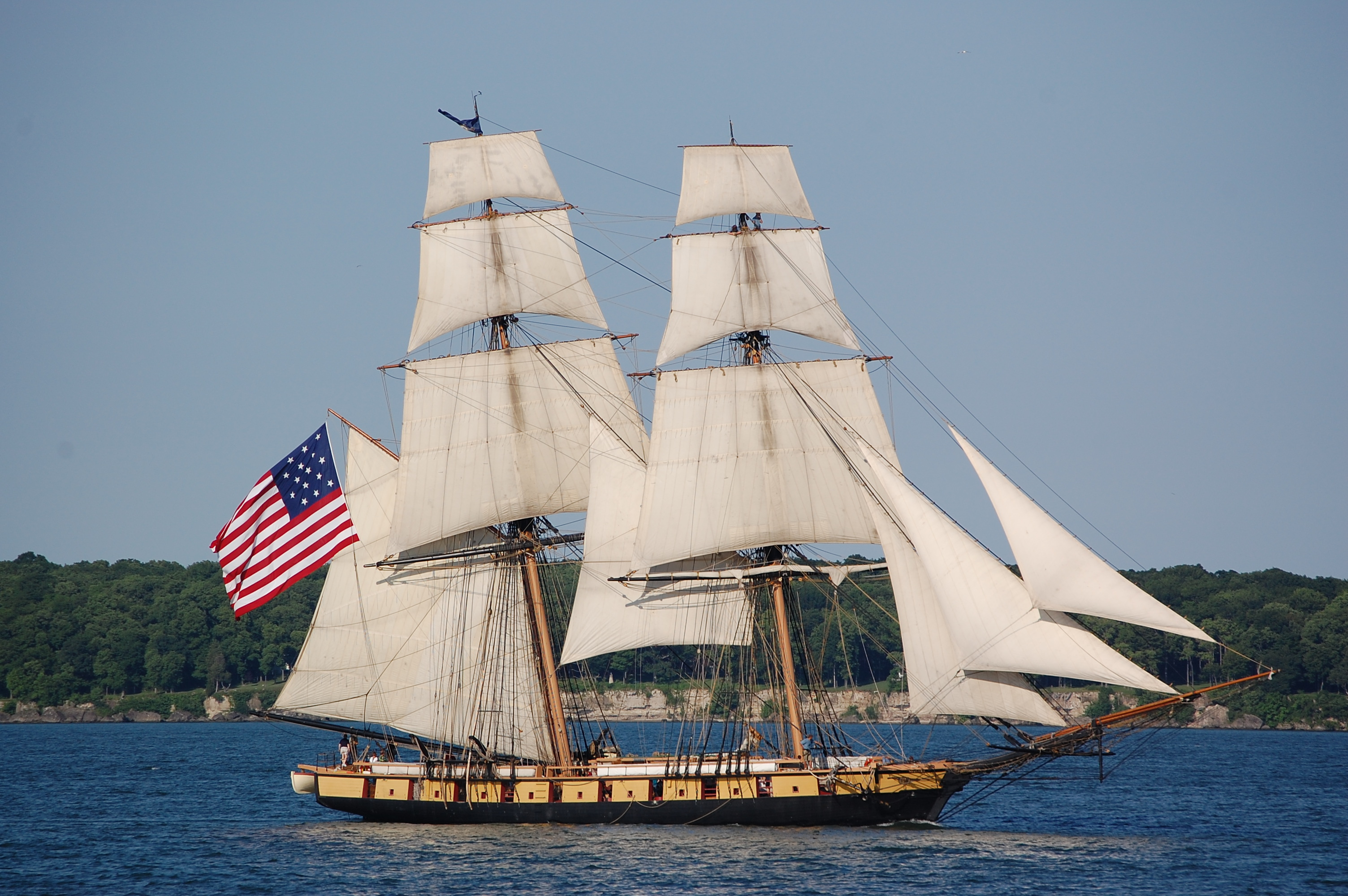
- Typical Brig (USS Niagara)

History

Great Britain
- Name: Jenny's Adventure
- Owner: 1785:William Swales, Whitby
- Builder: [British] Plantations (i.e., colonies, possibly Bermuda)
- Launched: 1757
- Fate: Sunk 23 January 1806

General characteristics
- Tons burthen: 163 (bm)
- Sail plan: Brig
- Armament: 2 × 3-pounder guns

Jenny's Adventure was a trawler and whaler in the 1780s to the very early 1800s. It had many masters over the years, and is notable for being sunk by the Broderick, the very ship which in 1824 saved the Hyperion's crew from their certain death at sea.

== Career ==
From 1784 to 1788 the Jenny's Adventure was in use as a whaler, going between Greenland and Whitby, under Mr Callender, and subsequently Greenland and Sunderland, under Mr Noble.

From 1793 to ? the Jenny's Adventure was in use as a merchant brig, traveling between Sunderland and Portsmouth, under multiple masters.

=== 1784 ===
On 6 August 1784, the Jenny's Adventure, Calendor, master, arrived at Whitby from Greenland, carrying five "fish" (whales).

=== 1785 ===
On 26 March 1785, the Jenny's Adventure, Callender, master sailed from Whitby to Greenland.

On 15 July 1785, the Jenny's Adventure had a full ship, of presumably 'fish', this information was passed to the Young Eagle from Greenland, who passed this along to a Captain Jackson, who passed this to the Grand Bay

On 17 July 1785 the Jenny's Adventure, Calender, master, arrived at Whitby from Greenland, carrying 8 'fish'

=== 1786 ===
On 30 March 1786, the Jenny's Adventure, Callender, master, sailed for Greenland.

On 18 July 1786, the Jenny's Adventure, Calender, master, arrived at Whitby from Greenland, carrying 7 'fish'.

=== 1787 ===
On 20 August 1787, the Jenny's Adventure, Noble, master, arrived at Sunderland from Greenland.

=== 1788 ===
On 8 August 1788, the Jenny's Adventure, Noble, master, arrived at Sunderland from Greenland, carrying 4 'fish'.

=== 1793 ===
On 20 July 1793, the Jenny's Adventure, Knags, master, arrived at Portsmouth from Sunderland.

On 2 August 1793, the Jenny's Adventure, Rigg, master, arrived at Portsmouth from Sunderland.

On 17 September 1793, the Jenny's Adventure, Shield, master, arrived at Portsmouth from Sunderland.

=== 1800 ===
Jenny's Adventure first appeared in the Register of Shipping (RS) in 1800 (the first year of its publication).

Year	Master	Owner	Trade	Source &notes
1800	J.Shields	C.J.Kay	Sunderland–Archangel	RS; good repair 1798
1806	Cornforth	C.J.Kay	Sunderland coaster	RS; good repair 1798 & damages repaired 1804

== Fate ==
Broderick, of North Shields, sank Jenny's Adventure on 23 January 1806 when Broderick ran into Jenny's Adventure. Three of the crew of Jenny's Adventure died in the accident. Her entry in the RS volume for 1806 carried the annotation "LOST".
