= Exterior dimension =

In geometry, exterior dimension is a type of dimension that can be used to characterize the scaling behavior of "fat fractals". A fat fractal is defined to be a subset of Euclidean space such that, for every point $p$ of the set and every sufficiently small number $\epsilon$, the ball of radius $\epsilon$ centered at $p$ contains both a nonzero Lebesgue measure of points belonging to the fractal, and a nonzero Lebesgue measure of points that do not belong to the fractal. For such a set, the Hausdorff dimension is the same as that of the ambient space.

The Hausdorff dimension of a set $S$ can be computed by "fattening" $S$ (taking its Minkowski sum with a ball of radius $\epsilon$), and examining how the volume of the resulting fattened set scales with $\epsilon$, in the limit as $\epsilon$ tends to zero. The exterior dimension is computed in the same way but looking at the volume of the difference set obtained by subtracting the original set $S$ from the fattened set.

In the paper introducing exterior dimension, it was claimed that it would be applicable to networks of blood vessels. However, inconsistent behavior of these vessels in different parts of the body, the relatively low number of levels of branching, and the slow convergence of methods based on exterior dimension cast into doubt the practical applicability of this parameter.
