= Argo (1807 ship) =

History

United Kingdom
- Builder: C. Smales & Co., or Eskdale, Cato, & Co., Whitby
- Launched: 18 September 1807: Launched by or
- Fate: Last listed in 1824; possibly foundered in June 1824

General characteristics
- Tons burthen: 48020/94 or 484 (bm)
- Armament: 6 × 6-pounder guns

Argo was launched at Whitby in 1807 as a West Indiaman. She made one voyage to India under a license from the British East India Company (EIC). Thereafter she traded between Liverpool and Miramichi, New Brunswick. She was last listed in 1824 and may have foundered in June 1824.

== Career ==
Argo first appeared in Lloyd's Register (LR) in 1807.

Year	Master	Owner	Trade	Source
1807	Greenleaf	R.Dale	London–Jamaica	LR
1809	Greenleaf; Purdy	Dale	London–Jamaica	LR
1810	Purdy; Ferriman	Dale	London–Jamaica	LR
1811	Ferriman; W.Barclay	Milligan	London–Jamaica	LR
1816	W.Barclay	Milligan	London–Halifax	LR

In 1813 the EIC had lost its monopoly on the trade between India and Britain. British ships were then free to sail to India or the Indian Ocean under a license from the EIC. In 1817 Argo sailed for Bengal under a license from the EIC. On 27 June 1817 Captain W.Barclay sailed Argo for Fort William, India. Argo sailed from Bengal on 7 March 1818 and arrived off Margate on 23 July.

Year	Master	Owner	Trade	Source & notes
1818	W.Barclay	Milligan	Liverpool–Calcutta	LR
1819	W.Barclay; A.Adams	Milligan; Pollock & Co.	Liverpool–Calcutta; Greenock–Mirimac	LR
1821	A.Adams; J.Murray	Pollock & Co.	Liverpool–Mirimac	LR
1824	J.Murray	Pollock & Co.	Liverpool–Mirimac	LR; small repairs 1822 & 1823

== Fate ==
Argo was last listed in LR in 1824. An Argo, of Glasgow, foundered in June 1824 in the Atlantic Ocean (46°N 39°W) with the loss of four of her crew. Chilton, of Whitby, rescued the surviving crew and passengers and brought them into Miramichi.
