= Broderick (1786 ship) =

British merchantman and whaler 1786–1866

History
- Name: Broderick
- Builder: North Shields
- Launched: 1786
- Fate: Last listed 1866

General characteristics
- Tons burthen: 309, or 316, or 328 (bm)
- Propulsion: Sail
- Armament: 1799: 6 × 6-pounder guns; 1806: 2 × 6-pounder + 8 × 9-pounder guns + 2 × 18-pounder carronades

Broderick was launched at Shields in 1786. Between 1786 and 1793 she made seven annual voyages as a whaler in the northern whale fishery (Greenland and Davis Strait). In 1806 she accidentally sank Jenny's Adventure, but in 1824 she rescued the crew of Hyperion, which was foundering in the Atlantic. Broderick was last listed in 1866.

== Career ==
The following data is primarily from Coltish:

Year	Master	Whales	Tuns whale oil	Seals
1786		3	60	6
1787		3	60	6
1788	Crastor	5	112.5	0
1789	Broderick	7	137	0
1790		7	160.5	3
1791	Cloughton	4		
1792		1	26	20
1793		1	15.5	2

In 1788 Broderick was in the Davis Strait. Lloyd's List reported on 18 July 1788 that Broderick, Crastor, master, had returned to Shields having caught five "fish" (whales). A year later she returned from the Davis's Streights with seven large "fish".

On 4 November 1788, Broderick, arrived at Portsmouth from Gibraltar.

On 5 August 1791, Broderick, arrived at Shields, Cloughton, master, from Davis Strait, having taken four 'fish'.

Broderick first appeared in Lloyd's Register (LR) in 1799.

Year	Master	Owner	Trade	Source & notes
1799	T.Reed	Naters & Co.	London transport	LR
1800	T.Reed	Naters & Co.	London transport	LR; small repairs 1800
1806	T.Reed	Reed & Co.	Cork	LR; small repairs 1800, & keel and thorough repair 1803

On 23 January 1806, Broderick ran afoul of Jenny's Adventure, of Sunderland, off the Yorkshire coast, sinking her immediately. Three crew from Jenny's Adventure were killed.

Lloyd's List reported on 15 June 1824 that the crew of Hyperion, of Shields, had abandoned her in the Atlantic Ocean. Broderick, whilst bound for Quebec, under the command of R. Peart, master and owner, rescued the crew.

In 1834, Broderick, R. Peart, master and owner, sustained damages requiring repairs. At the time she was trading between Newcastle and the Baltic.

In 1845 Broderick was sailing between Shields and the Baltic and then Shields and America. Her master was W. Carr, and her owner R. Peart. She had undergone small repairs in 1839 and a large repair in 1842.

== Fate ==
Broderick was last listed in 1866 with T. Hopper, master, and S. Hewson, owner, and with trade London—Shields. That information had not changed since at least 1860 and may have been stale-dated.
