= Lost in hyperspace =

Feeling of disorientation related to hypertext

Lost in hyperspace (sometimes called Lost in hypertext) refers to a phenomenon of disorientation that a reader can experience when reading hypertext documents. This feeling was more prevalent from the 1990s into the early 2000s. Since then internet use has increased dramatically and this sensation has become less of an issue.

== Hypertext ==
If information is spread over web pages that are only linked by Hyperlinks, and the reader is given the opportunity to jump around within the text, it is possible they may lose track of what they have and have not read. In addition, online texts can be altered, so the reader must take into account that texts that have already been read could have been edited, deleted or had information added. This phenomenon can be frustrating for readers who are used to physical texts. They can feel “lost” in the text instead of viewing the freedom of choice as enriching. In addition, links can entice the reader to click on topics that distract them from their original intention - even if the text is linear and can be read from top to bottom. The vulnerability of the reader is also exploited by context-dependent online advertising such as web banners and pop-ups.

== Workarounds ==
Mechanisms that are already used for print media have been used in hypertext media to aid in the transition from physical texts, these include a table of contents, index or glossary, as well as footnotes or endnotes. Hypertext systems have their own navigation mechanisms, for example the forward and back buttons of web browsers or what is known as breadcrumb navigation. However, these mechanisms must be learned by the reader, which is made more difficult by different implementations in different systems. Special orientation aids for hypertexts such as search functions, sitemaps, bookmarks, history, and tabbed browsing can also alleviate the reader's lost-in-hyperspace dilemma. Successful navigation should provide answers to the questions: What is important? Where can I find relevant information? Where am I? What am I able to do here? How did I get here? Where can I go? How do I continue on, go back, or exit this page?

== Serendipity ==
Proponents of the hypertext paradigm also argue that when searching for certain information in a hypertext system, the reader often comes across additional, equally interesting information, which was not an intended phenomenon but accompanies the use of the internet. This incidental finding of information that one was not actually looking for is known as the serendipity effect. However, anyone who is used to reading a physical text of their interest will hardly be satisfied with this view.

Hypertext was a comparatively new form of information presentation during the 1990s and early 2000s. Since then browsing and using the internet has become a much larger part of daily life, increasing familiarity with navigating the internet. However similar issues remain today with advertisements and other distractions as well as information stability and validity.

== See also ==
- Information Overload
- Web Design
- Webometrics
- Hyperlink
