= HMS Hyperion =

Two ships of the Royal Navy have borne the name HMS Hyperion, after Hyperion, one of the Titans of Greek mythology. A third was planned but never completed:

- HMS Hyperion (1807) was a 32-gun fifth rate launched in 1807 and broken up in 1833.
- HMS Hyperion was to have been a wooden screw frigate. She was ordered in 1861 and cancelled in 1863.
- HMS Hyperion (H97) was a H-class destroyer launched in 1936. She was scuttled in 1940 after being damaged by a mine.
