= Extraordinary =

Extraordinary may refer to:

== Music ==
- "Extraordinary" (Clean Bandit song), 2014
- "Extraordinary" (Liz Phair song), 2004
- "Extraordinary" (Mandy Moore song), 2007
- "Extraordinary", a song by Idina Menzel from Idina, 2016
- "Extraordinary", a song by Prince from The Vault: Old Friends 4 Sale, 1999
- ExtraOrdinary, an EP by Nizlopi, 2006

== Television and film ==
- Extraordinary (TV series), a 2023–2024 British superhero comedy series
- The Extraordinary, a 1993–1997 Australian documentary series
- Extraordinary: The Stan Romanek Story, a 2013 documentary film about Stan Romanek
