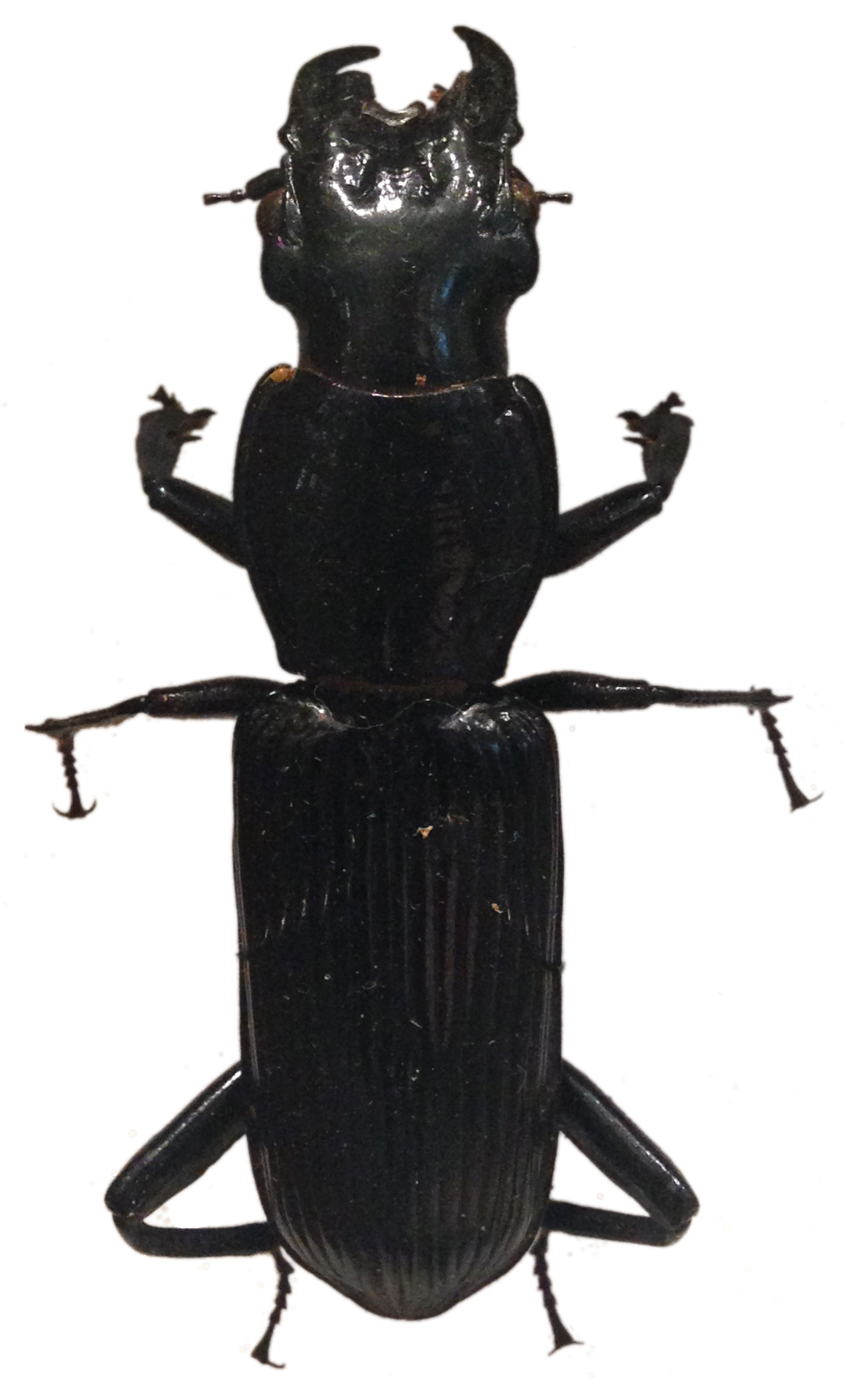

Scientific classification
- Kingdom: Animalia
- Phylum: Arthropoda
- Class: Insecta
- Order: Coleoptera
- Suborder: Adephaga
- Family: Carabidae
- Subfamily: Harpalinae
- Tribe: Morionini
- Genus: Hyperion; Castelnau, 1834
- Species: H. schroetteri

Binomial name
- Hyperion schroetteri (Schreibers, 1802)

= Hyperion schroetteri =

Species of beetles

Hyperion schroetteri is a species of beetles in the family Carabidae, the only species in the genus Hyperion. It is found in Australia and ranges from 2-7 centimetres in length.
