= Hyperion (Manticora album) =

Studio album by Manticora
- Released: 2002
- Recorded: Aabenraa Studios; Jailhouse Studios
- Genre: Power metal
- Label: Scarlet Records/King Records (Japan)/CD-Maximum
- Producer: Jacob Hansen

Manticora chronology
Darkness with Tales to Tell (2001)	Hyperion (2002)	8 Deadly Sins (2004)

Hyperion is a concept album by Manticora, released in 2002.

The album is based upon the novel Hyperion by Dan Simmons.

== Track listing ==
1. A Gathering of Pilgrims
2. Filaments of Armageddon
3. The Old Barge
4. Keeper of Time - Eternal Champion
5. Cantos
6. On a Sea of Grass - Night
7. Reversed
8. On a Sea of Grass - Day
9. A Long Farewell
10. At the Keep
11. Swarm Attack
12. Loveternaloveternal...
- Bonus tracks
1. Future World (Japanese Bonus, Pretty Maids cover)
