= 1050 Meta =

Stony, main-belt asteroid of the Eunomia family

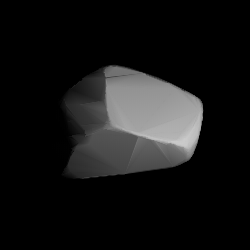
- Modelled shape of Meta from its lightcurve

Discovery
- Discovered by: K. Reinmuth
- Discovery site: Heidelberg Obs.
- Discovery date: 14 September 1925

Designations
- Named after: unknown
- Alternative designations: 1925 RC · A908 SE
- Minor planet category: main-belt · (middle); Eunomia

Orbital characteristics
- Epoch 23 March 2018 (JD 2458200.5)
- Uncertainty parameter 0
- Observation arc: 108.68 yr (39,694 d)
- Aphelion: 3.0904 AU
- Perihelion: 2.1599 AU
- Semi-major axis: 2.6252 AU
- Eccentricity: 0.1772
- Orbital period (sidereal): 4.25 yr (1,554 d)
- Mean anomaly: 233.12°
- Mean motion: 0° 13^{m} 54.12^{s} / day
- Inclination: 12.496°
- Longitude of ascending node: 342.33°
- Argument of perihelion: 66.282°

Physical characteristics
- Mean diameter: 8.773±0.115 km 9.196±0.079 km 10.03±0.65 km 10.53 km (calculated)
- Synodic rotation period: 6.14188±0.00001 h 6.142±0.001 h
- Geometric albedo: 0.21 (assumed); 0.294±0.042; 0.3346±0.0284; 0.364±0.062
- Spectral type: S (assumed)
- Absolute magnitude (H): 12.00 · 12.2; 12.34±0.09

1050 Meta, provisional designation 1925 RC, is a stony Eunomia asteroid from the central regions of the asteroid belt, approximately 10 kilometers (6 miles) in diameter. It was discovered on 14 September 1925, by German astronomer Karl Reinmuth at the Heidelberg Observatory in southwest Germany. The meaning of the asteroids's name is unknown. The presumably S-type asteroid has a rotation period of 6.14 hours and possibly an elongated shape.

== Orbit and classification ==
Meta is a member of the Eunomia family (502), a prominent family of stony S-type asteroid and the largest one in the intermediate main belt with more than 5,000 members. It orbits the Sun in the central asteroid belt at a distance of 2.2–3.1 AU once every 4 years and 3 months (1,554 days; semi-major axis of 2.63 AU). Its orbit has an eccentricity of 0.18 and an inclination of 12° with respect to the ecliptic.

The body's observation arc begins with its first observation as A908 SE at Heidelberg in October 1908, or 17 years prior to its official discovery observation.

== Naming ==
Any reference of this minor planet's name to a person or occurrence is unknown.

=== Unknown meaning ===
Among the many thousands of named minor planets, Meta is one of 120 asteroids, for which no official naming citation has been published. All of these asteroids have low numbers between 164 Eva and 1514 Ricouxa and were discovered between 1876 and the 1930s, predominantly by astronomers Auguste Charlois, Johann Palisa, Max Wolf and Karl Reinmuth.

== Physical characteristics ==
According to the overall spectral type for members of the Eunomia family, Meta is an assumed S-type asteroid.

=== Rotation period and poles ===
In October 2006, a rotational lightcurve of Meta was obtained from photometric observations by French amateur astronomer René Roy. Lightcurve analysis gave a well-defined rotation period of 6.142 hours with a brightness amplitude of 0.46 magnitude, indicating that the asteroid has an elongated shape (U=3).

A modeled lightcurve using photometric data from the Lowell Photometric Database was published in 2016. It gave a concurring period of 6.14188 hours, as well as two spin axes at (60.0°, −42.0°) and (198.0°, −79.0°) in ecliptic coordinates (λ, β).

=== Diameter and albedo ===
According to the surveys carried out by the Japanese Akari satellite and the NEOWISE mission of NASA's Wide-field Infrared Survey Explorer, Meta measures between 8.773 and 10.03 kilometers in diameter and its surface has an albedo between 0.294 and 0.364.

The Collaborative Asteroid Lightcurve Link assumes an albedo of 0.21 – derived from 15 Eunomia, the namesake and parent body of the Eunomia family – and calculates a diameter of 10.53 kilometers based on an absolute magnitude of 12.2.
