= Hyperion (1810 ship) =

History

United Kingdom
- Name: Hyperion
- Namesake: Hyperion
- Owner: John Barry
- Builder: Whitby
- Launched: 1810
- Fate: Lost 1823

General characteristics
- Tons burthen: 463, or 468, (bm)
- Length: 116 ft 5 in (35.5 m)
- Beam: 30 ft 9 in (9.4 m)
- Propulsion: Sail
- Armament: 1811:8 × 18-pounder carronades; 1815:2× 9-pounder guns + 10 × 18-pounder carronades

Hyperion was launched at Whitby in 1810. She traded with Canada and the Baltic but then sailed to India in 1817. After her return she traded with the Baltic and was lost there in 1823.

== Career ==
Hyperion enters the Registry of Shipping with Lashley, master, and trade Whitby to London, changing to London-based transport.

On 10 September 1815 Lloyd's List reported Hyperion, Lashley, master, had got on shore at Summers Island. She was got off and arrived in the Downs on 18 October. In its next issue Lloyd's List reported that it was not Hyperion, Lashley, master, from Petersburg to the Downs that had gone on shore but rather Hyperion, Davison, master, from Petersburg, that had gone on shore.

Hyperion sailed to the Indies, direct, on 3 January 1817. Lloyd's Register for 1822 showed Hyperion with her master changing from M. Lashley to Steward, and her trade from London—Bengal to London—Miramicha.

On 22 April 1821 Hyperion, Steward, master, of Whitby, was sailing to Danzig when she was driven on shore near Wingo (Sound), near Gothenburg. The Diving Company got her off with little damage and she arrived at Gothenburg two days later.

| Year | Master | Owner | Trade | Source | Master | Owner | Trade | Source |
|---|---|---|---|---|---|---|---|---|
| 1823 | Steward | J.Barry | London—"Mrmc" | Lloyd's Register | J. Stewart | Barry | London—Newfoundland | Register of Shipping |
| 1824 | Stewart | J. Barry | London—Riga | Lloyd's Register | J. Stewart | Barry | London—Newfoundland | Register of Shipping |

== Fate ==
On 23 December 1823 Lloyd's List reported that Hyperion, Steward, master, was driven ashore at Ystad. Her crew were rescued but she was expected to be a total loss. At the time she was returning from Riga, Russia, to London.
