= Hyperion, California =

Hyperion
- Former settlement
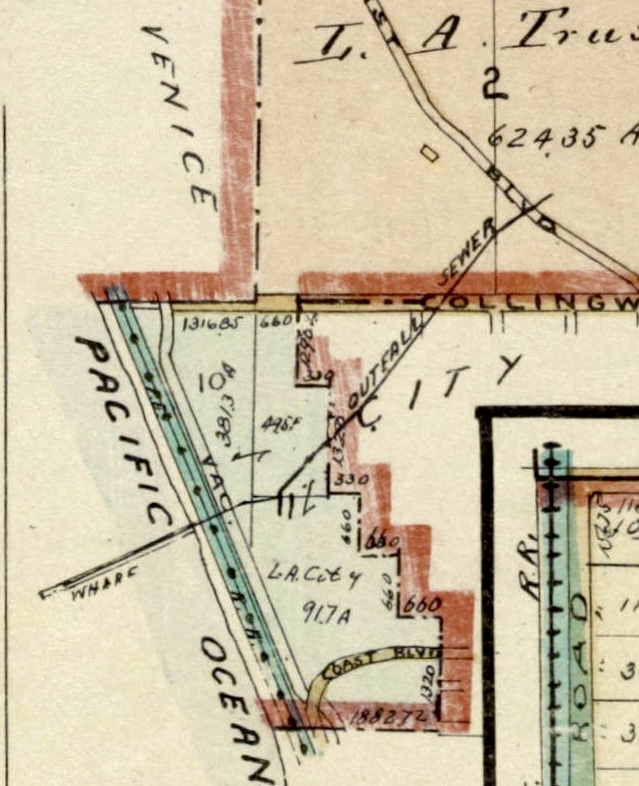
- Hyperion, 1921

- Location in California
- Coordinates: 33°55′34″N 118°25′58″W
- Country: United States
- State: California
- County: Los Angeles County
- Elevation: 33 ft (10 m)

Hyperion is a location in Los Angeles County, California. Hyperion was a stop on the Pacific Electric Redondo Beach via Playa del Rey Line that lay at an elevation of 33 feet (10 m). Hyperion still appeared on USGS maps as of 1934.

== Hyperion Pier ==
According to a history of Santa Monica, "Mayor [John C.] Steele co-operated most effectively with his fellow-commissioners in acquiring water-bearing lands in the Charnock Road section, also in the planning of a sewage disposal system, with Hyperion Pier, five miles south of the city, as its outfall point."

Hyperion Pier stood at this location from before 1912 to after 1937. The pier may have been the site of the outfall sewer into the ocean, as the wharf seemingly carried a redwood pipe 2,000 ft (610 m) "out to a submerged end." According to an interview with one sanitation engineer, it was a "five-foot wooden pipe made just like a barrel, only straight strips. The reason I know this, a guy came down from Oregon representing the wood industry, and he wanted a piece of that pipe. He got permission from the city of Los Angeles to go up to the top and saw out a little piece. And they wanted to show how long a piece of wood would stand sewage infiltration."

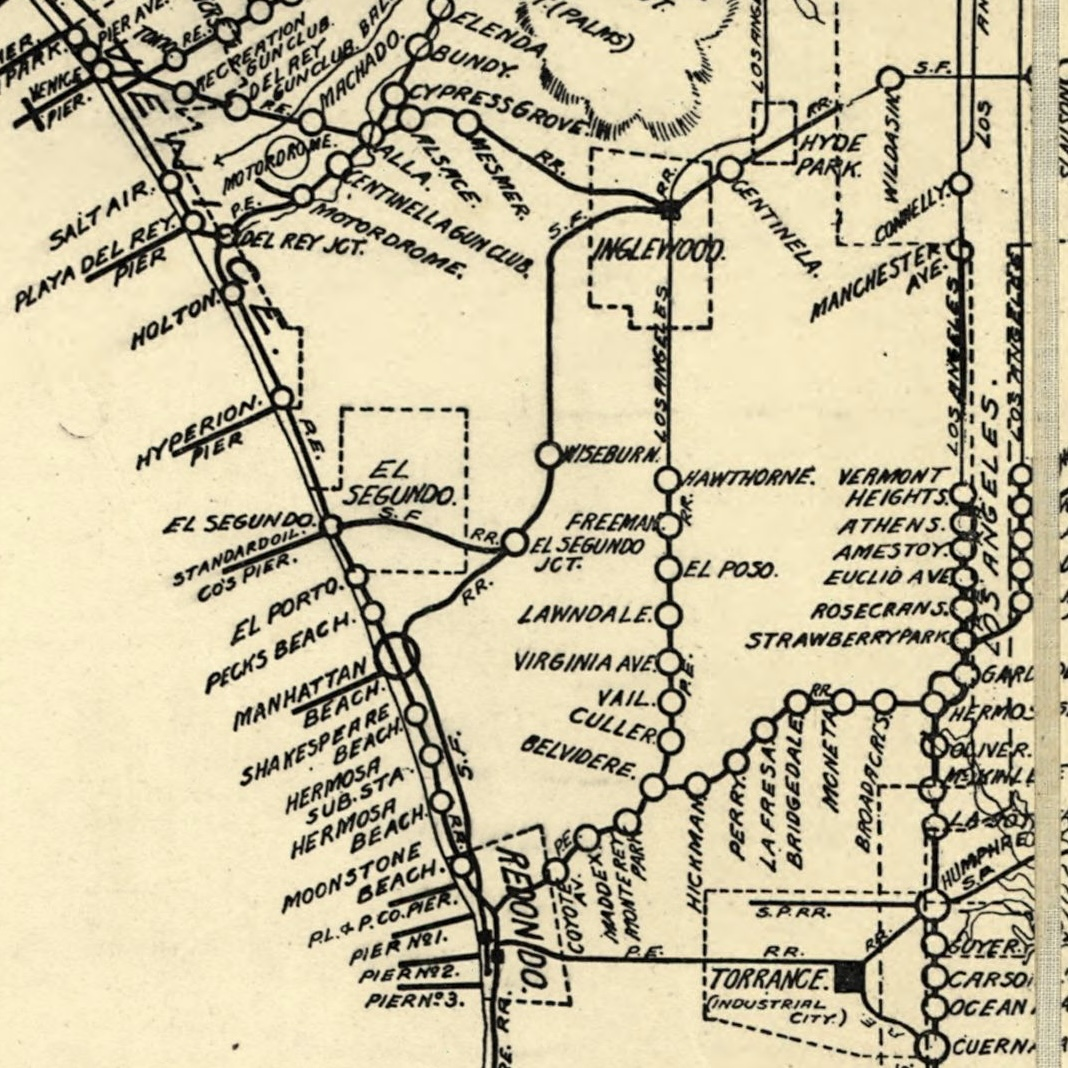
Streetcar stops, South Bay region of Los Angeles, 1912

== See also ==
- Holton, California
- Hyperion sewage treatment plant
