= Hyperion XP-1 =

Hydrogen sports car

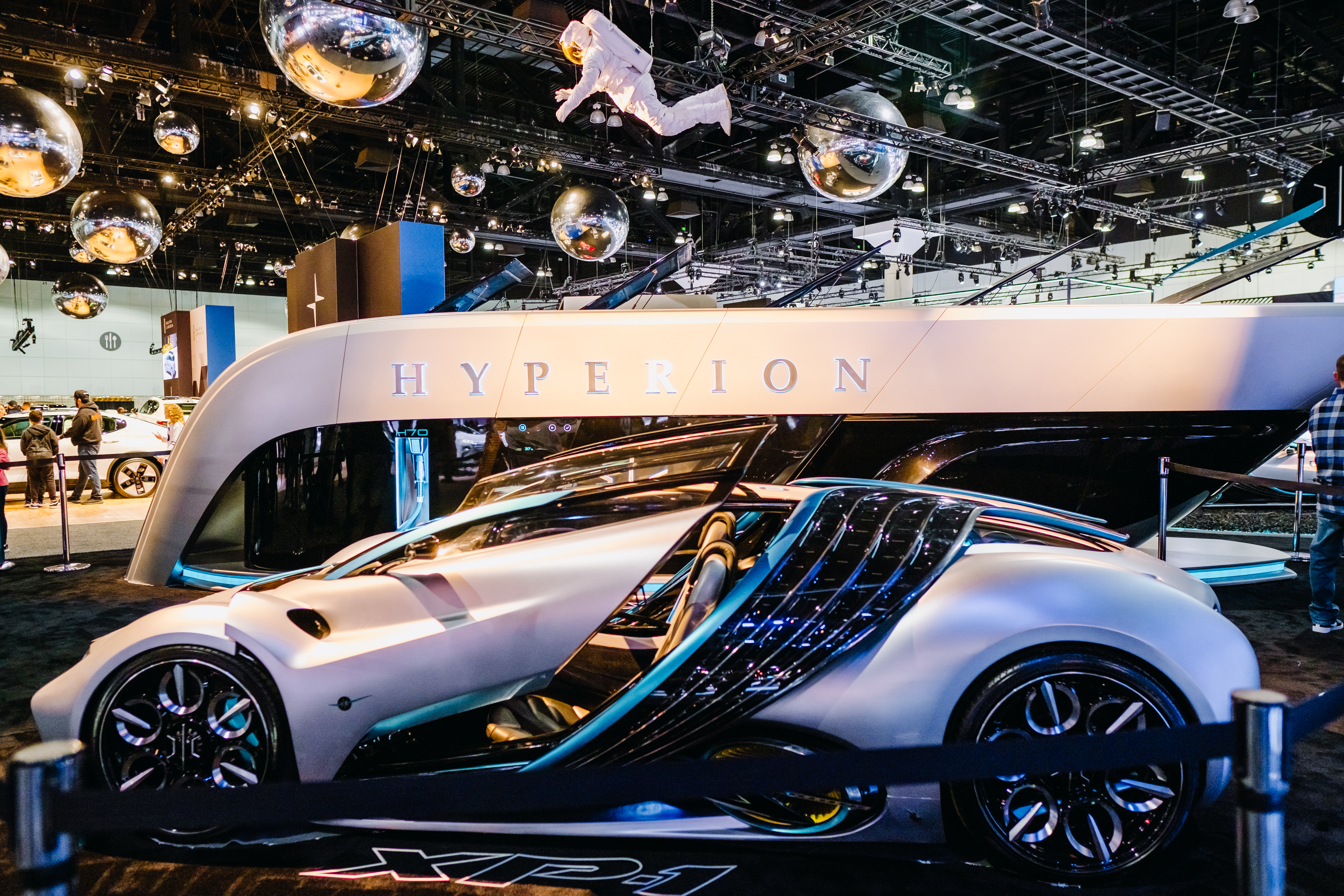

Overview
- Manufacturer: Hyperion Motors

Body and chassis
- Class: Sports car
- Body style: 2-door coupé
- Layout: 4-wheel drive

Powertrain
- Electric motor: 4 electric motors
- Power output: 2,038 hp (1,520 kW; 2,066 PS)
- Transmission: 3-speed automatic
- Range: 504–1,016 mi (811–1,635 km)

Dimensions
- Curb weight: 1,248 kg (2,751 lb)

The Hyperion XP-1 is a planned hydrogen-powered sports car being developed by American California-based automobile manufacturer Hyperion Motors. Unveiled to the public on August 12, 2020, it is the first car designed by the company.

== Specifications ==
The XP-1 is touted by Hyperion to be the first hydrogen-powered "hypercar" and has a maximum driving range of 1,016 miles (1,635 km), assuming that 55% of the driving is city and 45% is on the highway. The XP-1's curb weight is 2,751 pounds (1,248 kg) typical of many other gasoline-powered supercars in its class, helped by an ultra-light carbon-titanium monocoque chassis. The range of the XP-1 is longer than other hydrogen-powered vehicles such as the Toyota Mirai or the Honda Clarity due to its larger hydrogen tank. Hyperion plans to create mobile refueling stations that can generate hydrogen on-site with electricity generated from solar power. The XP-1 is powered by four electric motors, one at each wheel, which are powered by the main fuel cell. Hyperion states a top speed of 221 miles per hour (356 km/h) and a 0 to 60 mph (0 to 97 km/h) acceleration time of 2.2 seconds. The XP-1 comes with a three-speed automatic transmission, and will use ultracapacitors to increase the power output of the fuel cell to the electric motors.

== Design ==
The XP-1 took nearly a decade of development from the design to actual feasibility. The body includes active aerodynamic elements that double as solar panels. The double-barrel exhaust stacks allow deionized water vapor to come out as the only exhaust. The interior of the XP-1 features a 98-inch display that can be controlled by hand gestures, along with a 134-inch glass canopy. The V-wing doors are inspired by the "Winged Victory of Samothrace."

== Production ==
The XP-1 was unveiled in August 2020, and was scheduled to go into production in 2022 with a limited run of 300 units. As of April 2024, production had not yet begun, and one of seven development prototypes—fitted with a battery–electric powertrain and not hydrogen—was offered for auction by Hyperion.
