= Supra =

Supra may refer to:

- Supra (feast), an important part of Georgian social culture
- Toyota Supra, a sports car/grand tourer produced from 1978 to 2002, and then since 2019
- Supra (footwear brand)
- Sydney University Postgraduate Representative Association
- Supra Corporation, best known as a manufacturer of computer modems
- Supra (grammar), Latin for "above"
- FC Supra du Québec, a current soccer team in Laval, Canada
- Toronto Supra, a former soccer team in Toronto, Canada
- Montreal Supra, a former soccer team in Montreal, Canada
- Honda Wave series motorcycle, sold in Indonesia as Honda Supra
