= Metalanguage (disambiguation) =

Metalanguage is a language used to describe another language, in logic and linguistics, as well as metaprogramming.

Meta language may refer to:

- ML (programming language)
- Metaʼ language, spoken in Cameroon

== See also ==
- Natural semantic metalanguage, a linguistic theory reducing lexicons to sets of semantic primitives
