= Chilton (1802 ship) =

UK merchant ship 1802–1839

History

United Kingdom
- Name: Chilton
- Owner: 1802:Thos. and Harrison Chilton and Thos. Pierson; 1825:Harrison, Chilton, sen. and jun.
- Builder: Fishburn and Brodrick Whitby
- Launched: 1802
- Fate: Foundered 15 November 1839

General characteristics
- Tons burthen: 276, or 277, or 280, or 281 (bm)
- Armament: 6 × 6-pounder guns

Chilton was launched in 1802 in Whitby by Fishburn and Brodrick. After sailing to North America she became a West Indiaman, sailing between Britain and Jamaica. Between 1812 and 1817 or so she was a transport. Thereafter she traded to North America and more widely. In 1824 she rescued the survivors of a vessel that had foundered. She herself foundered in 1839.

== Career ==
Chilton first appeared in Lloyd's Register (LR) in 1803.

Year	Master	Owner	Trade	Source & notes
1803	W.Walker	T.Chilton	London–Charleston	LR
1804	W.Walker	T.Chilton	London–Charleston; London–Jamaica	LR
1811	W.Walker	T.Chilton	London–Jamaica	LR
1812	W.Walker	T.Chilton	Cowes transport	LR
1818	A.Douglas	T.Chilton	Liverpool–Nova Scotia	LR
1820	A.Douglas	T.Chilton	Hull–Prince Edward Island	LR
1822	A.Douglas; H.Chilton	T.Chilton	Hull–America	LR; repairs 1821
1823	H.Chilton; S.Gillie	T.Chilton	Liverpool–"Mrmc"	LR; repairs 1821
1824	S.Gillie; S.Gallilee	T.Chilton	Bristol–Quebec	LR; repairs 1821 & small repairs 1824
1825	S.Gallilee	T.Chilton	Liverpool–New Brunswick	LR; repairs 1821 & small repairs 1824

Argo, of Glasgow, foundered in June 1824 in the Atlantic Ocean (46°N 39°W) with the loss of four of her crew. Chilton, of Whitby, rescued the surviving crew and passengers and brought them into Miramichi.

Year	Master	Owner	Trade	Source & notes
1826	S.Gillie; S.Gallilee	T.Chilton	Bristol–Quebec	LR; repairs 1821 & small repairs 1824
1828	S.Gallilee; Muir	T.Chilton	Hull–Archangel	LR; repairs 1821 & small repairs 1824
1830	W.Muir	T.Chilton	Liverpool–Quebec	LR; repairs 1821 & small repairs 1824 & 1827
1830	W.Muir; Wildridge	Chilton & Co.	Hull–Mrmc	LR; repairs 1821 & small repairs 1824 & 1827, & repairs 1832

In November 1837 Thomas Chilton transferred Chilton's registry to Liverpool. (Note: Harrison Chilton had sold half of the shares in Chilton in January 1832 to Thomas Chilton, then living in Hull. The in September 1837 Harrison Chilton sold the other half of the shares to Thomas Chilton, then of Liverpool.)

LR carries minimal data from 1834 on. Still, newspapers reported that Chilton sailed to Pernambuco and Maranhan, Brazil. in 1837 and 1838.

== Fate ==
On 15 November 1839 Chilton sprang a leak and became waterlogged in the Atlantic Ocean with the loss of five of her thirteen crew. City of York rescued the survivors on 30 November.
