= USS Hyperion =

Cargo ship of the United States Navy

History

United States
- Name: Christopher C. Andrews; Hyperion
- Namesake: Christopher C. Andrews; The moon Hyperion
- Ordered: as a Type EC2-S-C1 hull, MCE hull 1563
- Builder: Permanente Metals Corporation, Richmond, California
- Yard number: 1563
- Way number: 1
- Laid down: 28 May 1943
- Launched: 24 June 1943
- Sponsored by: Mrs. Percy Lindt
- Acquired: 10 July 1943
- Commissioned: 25 August 1943
- Decommissioned: 16 November 1945
- Stricken: 28 November 1945
- Identification: Hull symbol: AK-107; Code letters: NTCO
- Honours and awards: 3 × battle stars
- Fate: Sold for scrapping and removed, 11 August 1961, scrapping completed, 24 April 1963

General characteristics
- Class & type: Crater-class cargo ship
- Displacement: 4,023 long tons (4,088 t) (standard); 14,550 long tons (14,780 t) (full load)
- Length: 441 ft 6 in (134.57 m)
- Beam: 56 ft 11 in (17.35 m)
- Draft: 28 ft 4 in (8.64 m)
- Installed power: 2 × Babcock & Wilcox header-type boilers, 220psi 450°; 2,500 shp (1,900 kW)
- Propulsion: 1 × Joshua Hendy vertical triple-expansion reciprocating steam engine; 1 × shaft
- Speed: 12.5 kn (23.2 km/h; 14.4 mph)
- Capacity: 7,800 t (7,700 long tons) DWT; 444,206 cu ft (12,578.5 m^{3}) (non-refrigerated)
- Complement: 206
- Armament: 1 × 5 in (127 mm)/38 caliber dual-purpose (DP) gun; 1 × 3 in (76 mm)/50 caliber DP gun; 2 × 40 mm (1.57 in) Bofors anti-aircraft (AA) gun mounts; 6 × 20 mm (0.79 in) Oerlikon cannon AA gun mounts

USS Hyperion (AK-107) was a Crater-class cargo ship in the service of the US Navy in World War II. Named after Saturn's moon Hyperion, she is the only ship of the Navy to bear this name.

== Construction ==
Hyperion, was laid down 28 May 1943, as Liberty ship SS Christopher C. Andrews, under a Maritime Commission (MARCOM) contract, MC hull 1563, by Permanente Metals Corporation, Yard No. 1, Richmond, California; sponsored by Mrs. Percy Lindt; launched 24 June 1943; acquired by the Navy from the War Shipping Administration (WSA) 10 July 1943; and commissioned 25 August 1943, at San Diego.

== Service history ==
With gasoline barge YOG-85 in tow, Hyperion sailed for the Pacific 18 September 1943, on what was to be a memorable voyage. During the 42-day trip, the tow was lost twice; lightning struck the mainmast; a crewman was lost in high seas; and emergency flares were spotted but nothing was found. Hyperion finally reached Espiritu Santo, New Hebrides on 30 October 1943. The following half year saw the cargo ship shuttling among the Solomon Islands bringing valuable supplies — gasoline, diesel oil, rolling stock, foodstuffs — to the staging area for some of the Pacific's most hard-fought campaigns.

On 5 April 1944 Hyperion steamed from the Solomons with 45 passengers in addition to her usual cargo of oil and supplies. Arriving 10 April 1944, at Emirau Island in the Bismarcks, occupied only three weeks earlier, Hyperion discharged cargo by day and steamed out to safety at night. She then returned to her valuable work in the staging areas, operating between New Caledonia, Guadalcanal, New Zealand, and the Bismarcks.

In the fall of 1944, as the war advanced steadily across the Pacific and culminated in the climactic Battle of Leyte Gulf, one of the greatest naval engagements of all time, Hyperion had her first taste of battle. Departing Espiritu Santo 22 September, Hyperion picked up stores at Tulagi and joined TG 78.8's reinforcement group which supported Admiral Daniel Barbey's Northern Attack Force TF 78. She sailed into Leyte Gulf in a 33-ship convoy 29 October 1944, only three days after the conclusion of that great battle. During the next two weeks, Hyperion went to general quarters 87 times, fought off 37 Japanese air attacks, and splashed 2 enemy planes.

Another tour of duty shuttling cargo in the staging area between New Zealand and New Caledonia ended in late April 1945, as Hyperion loaded 6,500 long tons (6,604 t) of US Army engineering equipment at Nouméa and steamed for Okinawa, still the scene of bloody fighting. During the 18 days it took her to discharge cargo at Okinawa beginning 8 May 1945, Hyperion witnessed naval bombardments of the Japanese positions on the island, the battles of Naha and Shuri, and countless kamikaze attacks — she was anchored less than 500 yd (457 m; 1,500 ft) from New Mexico when two suicide planes damaged the battleship 12 May 1945.

== Post-war decommissioning ==
As the war drew to a close, Hyperion sailed for San Francisco, California on 4 August 1945, ending two years of continuous service in the Pacific. The cargo ship had steamed some 75,225 nautical miles (86,570 mi; 139,320 km), carried 150,000 long tons (152,407 t) of cargo, transported over 1,000 passengers, made 62 voyages to 29 islands and 37 ports, and had fought at Leyte and Okinawa, Hyperion had crossed the equator six times and the International Date Line four times, she celebrated two Fourth of Julys in 1944.

After minor repairs at San Francisco, which she reached 24 August 1945, Hyperion sailed for the East Coast via the Panama Canal. Reaching Norfolk, Virginia on 24 October 1945, she decommissioned 16 November 1945, and was returned to the WSA the following day. Hyperion was placed in the MARCOM National Defense Reserve Fleet, and was berthed in the James River Group, Lee Hall, Virginia. On 31 July 1961, she was sold to Bethlehem Steel, along with 3 other ships, for $280,000. She was delivered 11 August 1961.

== Awards ==
Hyperion received three battle stars for World War II service.

== Notes ==
Citations

== Bibliography ==
Online resources

- "Hyperion". Dictionary of American Naval Fighting Ships. Naval History and Heritage Command. 21 July 2015. This article incorporates text from this source, which is in the public domain.
- "Kaiser Permanente No. 1, Richmond CA". www.ShipbuildingHistory.com. 13 October 2010.
- "USS Hyperion (AK-107)". NavSource. 13 June 2014.
- "Christopher C. Andrews". United States Department of Transportation. Archived from the original on 12 December 2019.
