= Hyperion (1814 ship) =

History

United Kingdom
- Name: Hyperion
- Namesake: Hyperion
- Owner: 1814:J. Davison; 1816:J. Short & Co.; 1823:Allen & Co.
- Builder: John & Robert Davison, Sunderland
- Launched: 19 July 1814
- Fate: Abandoned at sea in 1824

General characteristics
- Tons burthen: 400, or 4009/94 or 402 (bm)
- Propulsion: Sail

Hyperion was launched in 1814 at Sunderland. She sailed to the Baltic, and then India under a license from the British East India Company (EIC) . In 1820 the EIC chartered her for a voyage for them to India. On her return she traded with Canada until her crew had to abandon her in 1824 in the Atlantic.

== Career ==
Hyperion enters the Registry of Shipping in 1815 with Dandeson, master, changing to J. Davison, and J. Davison, owner. Her trade was Suderland—London, changing to London—Petersburg.

On 10 September 1815 Lloyd's List reported Hyperion, Lashley, master, had got on shore at Summers Island. She was got off and arrived in the Downs on 18 October. In its next issue Lloyd's List reported that it was not Hyperion, Lashley, master, from Petersburg to the Downs that had gone on shore but rather Hyperion, Davison, master, from Petersburg, that had gone on shore. Actually, Lloyd's List had already reported that Hyperion had gone on shore on Summers Island on 13 September, but that part of her cargo had been landed and that she was expected to be refloated. Hyperion was got off on 8 October and sent into Fredericksburg to repair.

Year	Master	Owner	Trade	Source
1816	J.Davison; H. Horne	J.Davison	London—Petersburg; London—India	Register of Shipping
1818	H. Horne; J. Galloway	J.Davison; J. Short	London—India; London—Bengal	Register of Shipping
1819	J. Galloway	J. Short	London—Bengal	Register of Shipping
1820	J. Galloway	J. Short	London—Bengal	Register of Shipping

The EIC then chartered Hyperion for one voyage to India and return.

EIC voyage (1820-1821): Captain Robert Wright Norfor sailed from the Downs on 26 June 1820, bound for Bombay. Hyperion reached the Cape of Good Hope on 29 September and arrived at Bombay on 31 December. Homeward bound, she was at Tellichery on 20 March 1821, Mauritius on 23 May, and Saint Helena on 25 July. She returned to her moorings on 4 October.

Year	Master	Owner	Trade	Source
1821	Norfar	J. Short	London—Bengal	Register of Shipping
1822	Norfar; Burleson	J. Short	London—Bengal; London—Quebec	Register of Shipping
1823	Burleson	J. Short	London—Quebec	Register of Shipping

This entry continues unchanged in the Register of Shipping into 1828, after which there is no mention of Hyperion. Lloyd's Register has different information.

Year	Master	Owner	Trade	Source
1823	R. Burlison; Stevens	J. Short	London—Quebec	Lloyd's Register
1824	C. Stevens	Allen & Co.	Liverpool—New Brunswick	Lloyd's Register
1825	C. Stevens	Allen & Co.	Liverpool—New Brunswick	Lloyd's Register

== Fate ==
Lloyd's List reported on 15 June 1824 that her crew had abandoned Hyperion, of "Shields", in the Atlantic Ocean. Broderick rescued the crew. (Note: Sunderland is slightly inland on the Tyne River, and North and South Shields are closer to the mouth. Also, Hyperion is a rare name and the registers show no vessel by that name from Shields, or anywhere else on or near the Tyne.)

Hyperion is no longer listed after 1825 in Lloyd's Register, or after 1828 in the Register of Shipping.
