= Hyperion (mythology) =

Set of mythological Greek characters

In Greek mythology, Hyperion (/haɪˈpɪəriən/; Greek: Ὑπερίων, romanized: Hyperíōn, 'the high one') may refer to two different characters:

- Hyperion, one of the Titans and father of Helios, Selene and Eos by his sister-wife Theia.
- Hyperion, a Trojan prince as one of the sons of King Priam of Troy by an unknown woman.

Hyperion is also a byname of the sun, Helios.
