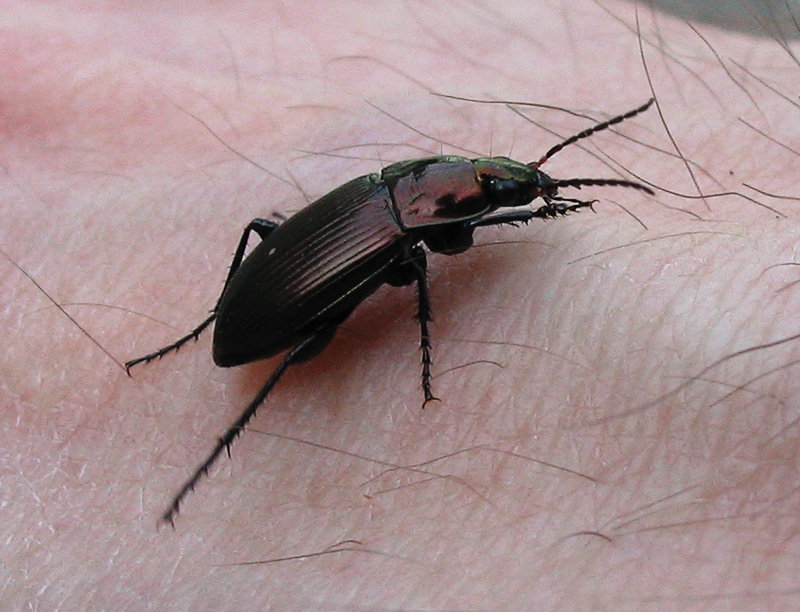
- Image of the common Eurasian species Poecilus cupreus

Scientific classification
- Kingdom: Animalia
- Phylum: Arthropoda
- Clade: Pancrustacea
- Class: Insecta
- Order: Coleoptera
- Suborder: Adephaga
- Family: Carabidae
- Subfamily: Pterostichinae; Bonelli, 1810

= Pterostichinae =

Subfamily of beetles

Pterostichinae is a subfamily of ground beetles (family Carabidae). It belongs to the advanced harpaline assemblage, and if these are circumscribed sensu lato as a single subfamily, Pterostichinae are downranked to a tribe Pterostichini. However, as the former Pterostichitae supertribe of the Harpalinae as loosely circumscribed does seem to constitute a lineage rather distinct from Harpalus, its core group is here considered to be the present subfamily and the Harpalinae are defined more narrowly.

They are usually mid-sized and rather stout ground beetles. Coloration is typically dark and without conspicuous patterns, but often with a strong sheen like polished metal. They are widely distributed and inhabit a wide range of terrestrial habitats. Unlike the more basal ground beetles which only eat small animals, the Pterostichinae include a large proportion of omnivorous or even herbivorous taxa.

== Systematics ==
This group includes the following tribes and genera:

Tribe Chaetodactylini Tschitscherine, 1903

- Chaetodactyla Tschitscherine, 1897

Tribe Cnemalobini Germain, 1911

- Cnemalobus Guerin-Meneville, 1838

Tribe Cratocerini Lacordaire, 1854

- Abacaelostus Straneo, 1952
- Andrewesinulus Straneo, 1938
- Apsidocnemus Alluaud, 1936
- Barylaus Liebherr, 1985
- Brachidius Chaudoir, 1852
- Caecocaelus Straneo, 1949
- Caelostomus W.S.MacLeay, 1825
- Camptogenys Tschitscherine, 1899
- Capabatus Csiki, 1930
- Catapiesis Solier, 1835
- Cratocerus Dejean, 1829
- Crenulostrigus Straneo, 1942
- Cyrtolaus Bates, 1882
- Dactyleurys Tschitscherine, 1899
- Dactylinius Straneo, 1941
- Diachipteryx Alluaud, 1925
- Diceromerus Chaudoir, 1873
- Dromistomus Jeannel, 1948
- Drymonaxus Straneo, 1941
- Feostoma Straneo, 1941
- Hemitelestus Alluaud, 1895
- Homalomorpha Brullé, 1837
- Hoplizomenus Chaudoir, 1873
- Leleuporites Straneo, 1960
- Madapelmus Dajoz, 1985
- Monodryxus Straneo, 1942
- Oxyglychus Straneo, 1938
- Pachycaecus Straneo, 1971
- Pachyroxochus Straneo, 1942
- Platyxythrius Lorenz, 1998
- Stegazopteryx Will, 2004
- Stomonaxellus Tschitscherine, 1901
- Strigomerodes Straneo, 1939
- Strigomerus Chaudoir, 1873
- Trichillinus Straneo, 1938

Tribe Microcheilini Jeannel, 1948

- Microcheila Brulle, 1834

Tribe Morionini Brulle, 1835

- Buderes Murray, 1857
- Hyperectenus Alluaud, 1935
- Hyperion Castelnau, 1834
- Megamorio Chaudoir, 1880
- Morion Latreille, 1810
- Morionidius Chaudoir, 1880
- Moriosomus Motschulsky, 1864
- Platynodes Westwood, 1846
- Stereostoma Murray, 1857

Tribe Pterostichini Bonelli, 1810

- (See Pterostichini for ~180 genera)

Tribe Zabrini Bonelli, 1810

- (See Zabrini for 3 genera)
