= Abacodes =

Abacodes may refer to:

- Abacodes Thomson, 1858, a genus of beetles in the family Carabidae, synonym of Buderes
- Abacodes Jeannel, 1948, a genus of beetles in the family Carabidae, synonym of Chaetodactyla
