= Dromistomus laticollis =

Scientific classification
- Kingdom: Animalia
- Phylum: Arthropoda
- Class: Insecta
- Order: Coleoptera
- Suborder: Adephaga
- Family: Carabidae
- Subfamily: Pterostichinae
- Tribe: Cratocerini
- Subtribe: Drimostomatina
- Genus: Dromistomus
- Species: D. laticollis

Binomial name
- Dromistomus laticollis (Boheman, 1848)

Synonyms
- Caelostomus depressulus Straneo, 1951

Species of beetle

Dromistomus laticollis is a species in the beetle family Carabidae. It is found in Kenya, Zimbabwe, and South Africa.

== Subspecies ==
These two subspecies belong to the species Dromistomus laticollis:

- Dromistomus laticollis kenyensis (Straneo, 1946) (Kenya)
- Dromistomus laticollis laticollis (Boheman, 1848) (Zimbabwe and South Africa)
