= Catapiesis =

Scientific classification
- Kingdom: Animalia
- Phylum: Arthropoda
- Class: Insecta
- Order: Coleoptera
- Suborder: Adephaga
- Family: Carabidae
- Subfamily: Pterostichinae
- Tribe: Cratocerini
- Subtribe: Catapieseina
- Genus: Catapiesis; Solier, 1835

Synonyms
- Axinophorus Gray, 1832; Basoleia Westwood, 1835; Basolia Chaudoir, 1854; Hololissus Mannerheim, 1837; Liobasis Agassiz, 1846

Genus of beetles

Catapiesis is a genus belonging to the ground beetle family Carabidae. There are about eight described species in Catapiesis, found in Mexico, Central America, and South America.

== Species ==
These eight species belong to the genus Catapiesis:

- Catapiesis attenuata (Chaudoir, 1862) (Colombia, Venezuela, and Ecuador)
- Catapiesis bartyrae Reichardt, 1970 (French Guiana and Brazil)
- Catapiesis brasiliensis (Gray, 1832) (Bolivia, Colombia, French Guiana, Peru, Brazil, and Panama)
- Catapiesis columbica Chevrolat, 1838 (Colombia)
- Catapiesis mexicana (Chaudoir, 1854) (Panama, Nicaragua, and Mexico)
- Catapiesis nitida Solier in Brullé, 1835 (Bolivia, Paraguay, Peru, and Brazil)
- Catapiesis sulcipennis Bates, 1882 (Mexico)
- Catapiesis tumida Reichardt, 1973 (Colombia)
