= Morion aridus =

Scientific classification
- Domain: Eukaryota
- Kingdom: Animalia
- Phylum: Arthropoda
- Class: Insecta
- Order: Coleoptera
- Suborder: Adephaga
- Family: Carabidae
- Subfamily: Harpalinae
- Genus: Morion
- Species: M. aridus

Binomial name
- Morion aridus Allen, 1969

Species of beetle

Morion aridus is a species of ground beetle in the family Carabidae. It is found in North America.
