= Camptogenys =

Scientific classification
- Domain: Eukaryota
- Kingdom: Animalia
- Phylum: Arthropoda
- Class: Insecta
- Order: Coleoptera
- Suborder: Adephaga
- Family: Carabidae
- Subfamily: Pterostichinae
- Tribe: Cratocerini
- Subtribe: Drimostomatina
- Genus: Camptogenys; Tschitscherine, 1899

Genus of beetles

Camptogenys is a genus in the ground beetle family Carabidae. There are at least three described species in Camptogenys.

== Species ==
These three species belong to the genus Camptogenys:

- Camptogenys aberrans (Tschitscherine, 1899)
- Camptogenys similis Tschitscherine, 1898
- Camptogenys trisetosa (A.Serrano, 1995)
