= Diceromerus =

Scientific classification
- Domain: Eukaryota
- Kingdom: Animalia
- Phylum: Arthropoda
- Class: Insecta
- Order: Coleoptera
- Suborder: Adephaga
- Family: Carabidae
- Subfamily: Pterostichinae
- Tribe: Cratocerini
- Subtribe: Drimostomatina
- Genus: Diceromerus; Chaudoir, 1873

Genus of beetles

Diceromerus is a genus in the beetle family Carabidae. There are at least two described species in Diceromerus.

== Species ==
These two species belong to the genus Diceromerus:

- Diceromerus insularis (Tschitscherine, 1899) (Madagascar)
- Diceromerus orientalis (Motschulsky, 1860) (China, Indomalaya)
