= Strigomerus =

Scientific classification
- Domain: Eukaryota
- Kingdom: Animalia
- Phylum: Arthropoda
- Class: Insecta
- Order: Coleoptera
- Suborder: Adephaga
- Family: Carabidae
- Subfamily: Pterostichinae
- Tribe: Cratocerini
- Subtribe: Drimostomatina
- Genus: Strigomerus; Chaudoir, 1873

Synonyms
- Exocus Péringuey, 1896

Genus of beetles

Strigomerus is a genus in the ground beetle family Carabidae. There are about 18 described species in Strigomerus, found in Africa.

== Species ==
These 18 species belong to the genus Strigomerus:

- Strigomerus basilewskyanus Straneo, 1954 (Guinea, Sierra Leone, DR Congo)
- Strigomerus cribratus Straneo, 1942 (Zimbabwe)
- Strigomerus damarensis (Kuntzen, 1919) (Zimbabwe, Namibia, South Africa)
- Strigomerus ferrugineus (Péringuey, 1896) (Sierra Leone, Congo, DR Congo, Rwanda, Zimbabwe, South Africa)
- Strigomerus freyi Straneo, 1958 (Guinea, Ivory Coast, Ghana)
- Strigomerus girardi Straneo, 1991 (Guinea and Ivory Coast)
- Strigomerus glaber Straneo, 1941 (Sierra Leone)
- Strigomerus katanganus Burgeon, 1935 (DR Congo)
- Strigomerus latibasis Straneo, 1958 (Guinea, Ivory Coast, Ghana, DR Congo)
- Strigomerus levisternus Straneo, 1942 (Central African Republic, Congo, DR Congo, Rwanda)
- Strigomerus magnus (Straneo, 1951) (Guinea, Ivory Coast, Central African Republic, Congo, DR Congo, Rwanda)
- Strigomerus marshalli Straneo, 1941 (Nigeria, Cameroon, DR Congo, Kenya, Burundi, Tanzania, South Africa)
- Strigomerus meruensis Straneo, 1948 (Kenya)
- Strigomerus parvicollis Straneo, 1939 (Kenya and Tanzania)
- Strigomerus schoenherri (Dejean, 1831) (Guinea, Sierra Leone, Ivory Coast, Nigeria, Cameroon, Congo, DR Congo)
- Strigomerus sulcipennis (Dejean, 1831) (Guinea, Sierra Leone, DR Congo, Angola)
- Strigomerus trisetosus Straneo, 1986 (Tanzania)
- Strigomerus troglophilus Straneo, 1985 (Somalia)
