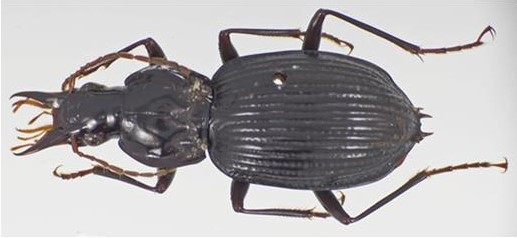
- Cyrtolaus spinicauda

Scientific classification
- Kingdom: Animalia
- Phylum: Arthropoda
- Class: Insecta
- Order: Coleoptera
- Suborder: Adephaga
- Family: Carabidae
- Subfamily: Pterostichinae
- Genus: Cyrtolaus; Bates, 1882

= Cyrtolaus =

Genus of beetles

Cyrtolaus is a genus of beetles in the family Carabidae, containing the following species:

- Cyrtolaus brevispina Whitehead & Ball, 1975
- Cyrtolaus furculifer Bates, 1882
- Cyrtolaus grumufer Whitehead & Ball, 1975
- Cyrtolaus lobipennis Bates, 1882
- Cyrtolaus newtoni Whitehead & Ball, 1975
- Cyrtolaus oaxacana Ball, 1991
- Cyrtolaus orizabae (Csiki, 1930)
- Cyrtolaus ricardo Whitehead & Ball, 1975
- Cyrtolaus spinicauda Bates, 1882
- Cyrtolaus subiridescens Whitehead & Ball, 1975
- Cyrtolaus whiteheadi Ball, 1991
