= Cratocerus =

Scientific classification
- Kingdom: Animalia
- Phylum: Arthropoda
- Class: Insecta
- Order: Coleoptera
- Suborder: Adephaga
- Family: Carabidae
- Subfamily: Pterostichinae
- Tribe: Cratocerini
- Subtribe: Cratocerina
- Genus: Cratocerus; Dejean, 1829

Type species
- Cratocerus monilicornis Dejean, 1829

Genus of beetles

Cratocerus is a genus of beetles in the family Carabidae. There are about eight described species in Cratocerus, found in Central and South America.

- Cratocerus culpepperi Grzymala & Will, 2014
- Cratocerus indupalmensis Grzymala & Will, 2014
- Cratocerus kavanaughi Grzymala & Will, 2014
- Cratocerus monilicornis Dejean, 1829
- Cratocerus multisetosus Grzymala & Will, 2014
- Cratocerus sinesetosus Grzymala & Will, 2014
- Cratocerus sulcatus Chaudoir, 1852
- Cratocerus tanyae Grzymala & Will, 2014
