= Drymonaxus =

Scientific classification
- Kingdom: Animalia
- Phylum: Arthropoda
- Class: Insecta
- Order: Coleoptera
- Suborder: Adephaga
- Family: Carabidae
- Subfamily: Pterostichinae
- Tribe: Cratocerini
- Subtribe: Drimostomatina
- Genus: Drymonaxus; Straneo, 1941
- Species: D. feanus

Binomial name
- Drymonaxus feanus (Straneo, 1941)

Genus of beetles

Drymonaxus is a genus in the ground beetle family Carabidae. This genus has a single species, Drymonaxus feanus. It is found in Equatorial Guinea.
