= Stomonaxellus =

Scientific classification
- Domain: Eukaryota
- Kingdom: Animalia
- Phylum: Arthropoda
- Class: Insecta
- Order: Coleoptera
- Suborder: Adephaga
- Family: Carabidae
- Subfamily: Pterostichinae
- Tribe: Cratocerini
- Subtribe: Drimostomatina
- Genus: Stomonaxellus; Tschitscherine, 1901

Genus of beetles

Stomonaxellus is a genus in the ground beetle family Carabidae. There are at least two described species in Stomonaxellus.

== Species ==
These two species belong to the genus Stomonaxellus:

- Stomonaxellus ceylanensis (Straneo, 1938) (Sri Lanka)
- Stomonaxellus filicornis Tschitscherine, 1901 (India)
