= Brachidius =

Brachidius crassicornis

Scientific classification
- Kingdom: Animalia
- Phylum: Arthropoda
- Class: Insecta
- Order: Coleoptera
- Suborder: Adephaga
- Family: Carabidae
- Subfamily: Pterostichinae
- Genus: Brachidius; Chaudoir, 1852
- Species: B. crassicornis

Binomial name
- Brachidius crassicornis Chaudoir, 1852

Genus of beetles

Brachidius crassicornis is a species of beetles in the family Carabidae, the only species in the genus Brachidius.
