= Trichillinus =

Scientific classification
- Kingdom: Animalia
- Phylum: Arthropoda
- Class: Insecta
- Order: Coleoptera
- Suborder: Adephaga
- Family: Carabidae
- Subfamily: Pterostichinae
- Tribe: Cratocerini
- Subtribe: Drimostomatina
- Genus: Trichillinus; Straneo, 1938

Subgenera
- Bruneauites Straneo, 1980; Mallopelmus Straneo, 1942; Trichillinus Straneo, 1938; Trichillodes Straneo, 1980

Genus of beetles

Trichillinus is a genus of ground beetles in the family Carabidae. There are more than 20 described species in Trichillinus, found in Africa.

== Species ==
These 22 species belong to the genus Trichillinus:

- Trichillinus abacetoides (Alluaud, 1936) (Madagascar)
- Trichillinus basilewskyi (Straneo, 1949) (Sub-Saharan Africa)
- Trichillinus capitatus (Straneo, 1949) (Sub-Saharan Africa)
- Trichillinus congoensis (Straneo, 1949) (Sub-Saharan Africa)
- Trichillinus dactyleuryoides (Alluaud, 1936) (Madagascar)
- Trichillinus dirotoides (Alluaud, 1936) (Cameroon)
- Trichillinus guineensis (Alluaud, 1936) (Sub-Saharan Africa)
- Trichillinus lamottei (Straneo, 1949) (Sub-Saharan Africa)
- Trichillinus leleupi (Straneo, 1950) (Sub-Saharan Africa)
- Trichillinus linearis (Straneo, 1949) (Sub-Saharan Africa)
- Trichillinus mirei (Straneo, 1980) (Cameroon)
- Trichillinus obesus (Alluaud, 1936) (Sub-Saharan Africa)
- Trichillinus perrieri (Jeannel, 1948) (Madagascar)
- Trichillinus ranomafanae Kavanaugh & Rainio, 2016 (Madagascar)
- Trichillinus robustus (Straneo, 1949) (Sub-Saharan Africa)
- Trichillinus schoutedeni (Straneo, 1949) (Sub-Saharan Africa)
- Trichillinus semlikianus (Alluaud, 1936) (Sub-Saharan Africa)
- Trichillinus sicardi (Jeannel, 1948) (Madagascar)
- Trichillinus strangulatus (Alluaud, 1936) (Cameroon)
- Trichillinus subcongoensis (Straneo, 1951) (Sub-Saharan Africa)
- Trichillinus sublaevis (Straneo, 1949) (Sub-Saharan Africa)
- Trichillinus terricola (Straneo, 1951) (Sub-Saharan Africa)
