= Dromistomus =

Scientific classification
- Domain: Eukaryota
- Kingdom: Animalia
- Phylum: Arthropoda
- Class: Insecta
- Order: Coleoptera
- Suborder: Adephaga
- Family: Carabidae
- Subfamily: Pterostichinae
- Tribe: Cratocerini
- Subtribe: Drimostomatina
- Genus: Dromistomus; Jeannel, 1948

Genus of beetles

Dromistomus is a genus of in the beetle family Carabidae. There are about five described species in Dromistomus.

== Species ==
These five species belong to the genus Dromistomus:

- Dromistomus complanatus (Bates, 1889) (Africa)
- Dromistomus depressus Jeannel, 1948 (Madagascar)
- Dromistomus laticollis (Boheman, 1848) (Kenya, Zimbabwe, and South Africa)
- Dromistomus levis Jeannel, 1948 (Madagascar)
- Dromistomus tenuilimbatus Jeannel, 1948 (Madagascar)
