= Pachyroxochus =

Scientific classification
- Kingdom: Animalia
- Phylum: Arthropoda
- Class: Insecta
- Order: Coleoptera
- Suborder: Adephaga
- Family: Carabidae
- Subfamily: Pterostichinae
- Tribe: Cratocerini
- Subtribe: Drimostomatina
- Genus: Pachyroxochus; Straneo, 1942

Genus of beetles

Pachyroxochus is a genus in the ground beetle family Carabidae. There are at least three described species in Pachyroxochus, found in Africa.

== Species ==
These three species belong to the genus Pachyroxochus:

- Pachyroxochus gabonicus Straneo, 1949 (Gabon)
- Pachyroxochus lebisi Straneo, 1949 (Cameroon)
- Pachyroxochus subquadratus Straneo, 1942 (Sao Tome)
