= Barylaus =

Scientific classification
- Kingdom: Animalia
- Phylum: Arthropoda
- Class: Insecta
- Order: Coleoptera
- Suborder: Adephaga
- Family: Carabidae
- Subfamily: Pterostichinae
- Genus: Barylaus; Liebherr, 1985

Genus of beetles

Barylaus is a genus of beetles in the family Carabidae, containing the following species:

- Barylaus estriata (Darlington, 1939)
- Barylaus puncticeps (Darlington, 1939)
