= Andrewesinulus =

Scientific classification
- Kingdom: Animalia
- Phylum: Arthropoda
- Class: Insecta
- Order: Coleoptera
- Suborder: Adephaga
- Family: Carabidae
- Subfamily: Pterostichinae
- Genus: Andrewesinulus; Straneo, 1938

Genus of beetles

Andrewesinulus is a genus of beetles in the family Carabidae, containing the following species:

- Andrewesinulus enganensis (Straneo, 1938)
- Andrewesinulus gibbus (Andrewes, 1931)
- Andrewesinulus ovum (Alluaud, 1897)
- Andrewesinulus singularis (Andrewes, 1929)
- Andrewesinulus vadoni Jeannel, 1948
