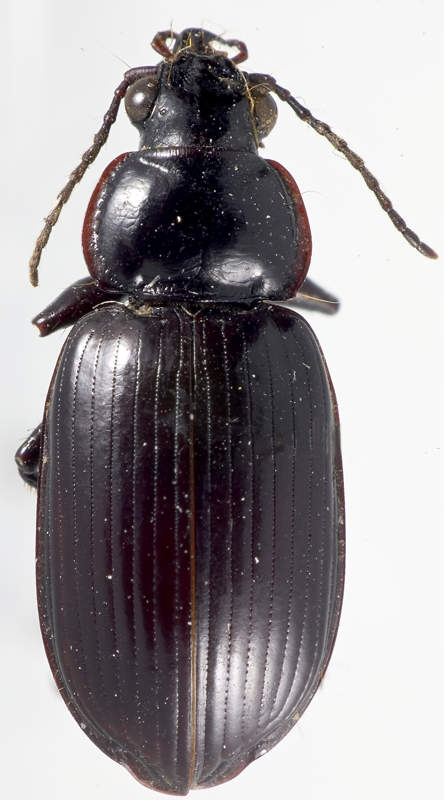
- Microcheila picea

Scientific classification
- Domain: Eukaryota
- Kingdom: Animalia
- Phylum: Arthropoda
- Class: Insecta
- Order: Coleoptera
- Suborder: Adephaga
- Family: Carabidae
- Subfamily: Pterostichinae
- Tribe: Microcheilini
- Genus: Microcheila; Brullé, 1835

Synonyms
- Microchila Agassiz, 1846

= Microcheila =

Genus of beetles

Microcheila is a genus in the ground beetle family Carabidae. There are at least two described species in Microcheila, found in Madagascar.

== Species ==
These two species belong to the genus Microcheila:

- Microcheila denticollis Jeannel, 1948
- Microcheila picea Brullé, 1835
