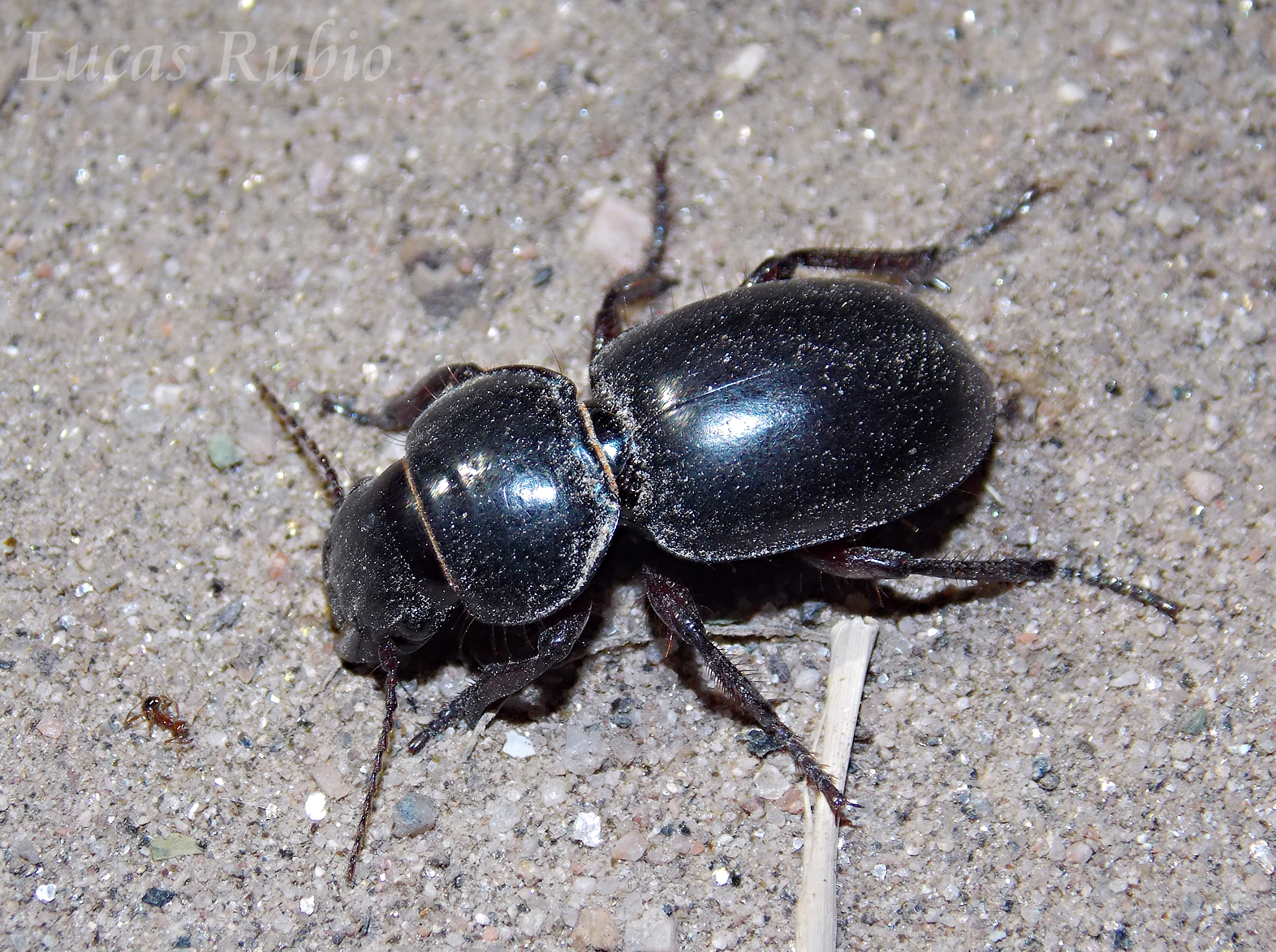
- Cnemalobus, Argentina

Scientific classification
- Kingdom: Animalia
- Phylum: Arthropoda
- Clade: Pancrustacea
- Class: Insecta
- Order: Coleoptera
- Suborder: Adephaga
- Family: Carabidae
- Subfamily: Pterostichinae
- Tribe: Cnemalobini
- Genus: Cnemalobus; Guérin-Méneville, 1838

= Cnemalobus =

Genus of beetles

Cnemalobus is a genus in the beetle family Carabidae. There are more than 40 described species in Cnemalobus, found in South America.

== Species ==
These 41 species belong to the genus Cnemalobus:

- Cnemalobus araucanus Germain, 1901 (Chile and Argentina)
- Cnemalobus bruchi Roig-Juñent, 1993 (Argentina)
- Cnemalobus chelenkoensis Cid-Arcos & Campodonico, 2019 (Chile)
- Cnemalobus coerulescens (Chaudoir, 1861) (Bolivia)
- Cnemalobus convexus Germain, 1901 (Chile)
- Cnemalobus coquimbanus Roig-Juñent, 2002 (Chile)
- Cnemalobus curtisii (G.R.Waterhouse, 1841) (Argentina)
- Cnemalobus cyaneus (Brullé, 1835) (Chile)
- Cnemalobus cyathicollis (Solier, 1849) (Chile)
- Cnemalobus cylindricus Roig-Juñent, 1994 (Chile)
- Cnemalobus deplanatus Roig-Juñent, 1993 (Argentina)
- Cnemalobus desmarestii (Guérin-Méneville, 1838) (Argentina)
- Cnemalobus diamante Roig-Juñent & Ruiz-Manzanos, 2007 (Argentina)
- Cnemalobus gayi Putzeys, 1868 (Chile)
- Cnemalobus gentilii Roig-Juñent, 2002 (Argentina)
- Cnemalobus germaini Putzeys, 1868 (Chile)
- Cnemalobus gustavoi Roig-Juñent & Quiroga, 2021 (Argentina)
- Cnemalobus hirsutus Lagos & Roig-Juñent, 1997 (Chile)
- Cnemalobus inacayali Roig-Juñent; Silvestro & Cheli, 2020
- Cnemalobus litoralis Roig-Juñent, 1993 (Argentina)
- Cnemalobus mapuche Roig-Juñent, 2002 (Argentina)
- Cnemalobus mendozensis Roig-Juñent, 1993 (Argentina)
- Cnemalobus montanus Roig-Juñent, 1994 (Chile)
- Cnemalobus neuquensis Roig-Juñent, 1993 (Argentina)
- Cnemalobus nevado Roig-Juñent & Cararra, 2007 (Argentina)
- Cnemalobus nuria Roig-Juñent, 1994 (Chile)
- Cnemalobus obscurus (Brullé, 1835) (Chile)
- Cnemalobus pampensis Putzeys, 1868 (Chile)
- Cnemalobus pegnai (Nègre, 1973) (Chile)
- Cnemalobus piceus Roig-Juñent, 1994 (Chile)
- Cnemalobus plicicollis (Fairmaire, 1884) (Chile)
- Cnemalobus pulchellus Roig-Juñent, 1994 (Chile)
- Cnemalobus reichardti Roig-Juñent, 1994 (Chile)
- Cnemalobus somuncura Roig-Juñent & Agrain, 2007 (Argentina)
- Cnemalobus striatipennis Roig-Juñent, 1994 (Chile)
- Cnemalobus striatus Guérin-Méneville, 1838 (Argentina and Uruguay)
- Cnemalobus substriatus (G.R.Waterhouse, 1841) (Chile)
- Cnemalobus sulcatus (Chaudoir, 1854) (Chile)
- Cnemalobus sulciferus Philippi, 1864 (Chile)
- Cnemalobus troll Roig-Juñent & Sackmann, 2007 (Argentina)
- Cnemalobus tupungatensis Roig-Juñent, 2002 (Argentina)
