= Dactyleurys =

Scientific classification
- Domain: Eukaryota
- Kingdom: Animalia
- Phylum: Arthropoda
- Class: Insecta
- Order: Coleoptera
- Suborder: Adephaga
- Family: Carabidae
- Subfamily: Pterostichinae
- Tribe: Cratocerini
- Subtribe: Drimostomatina
- Genus: Dactyleurys; Tschitscherine, 1899

Genus of beetles

Dactyleurys is a genus in the beetle family Carabidae. There are at least three described species in Dactyleurys, found in Madagascar.

== Species ==
These three species belong to the genus Dactyleurys:

- Dactyleurys anomalus Tschitscherine, 1899
- Dactyleurys minimus Kavanaugh & Rainio, 2016
- Dactyleurys ranomafanae Kavanaugh & Rainio, 2016
