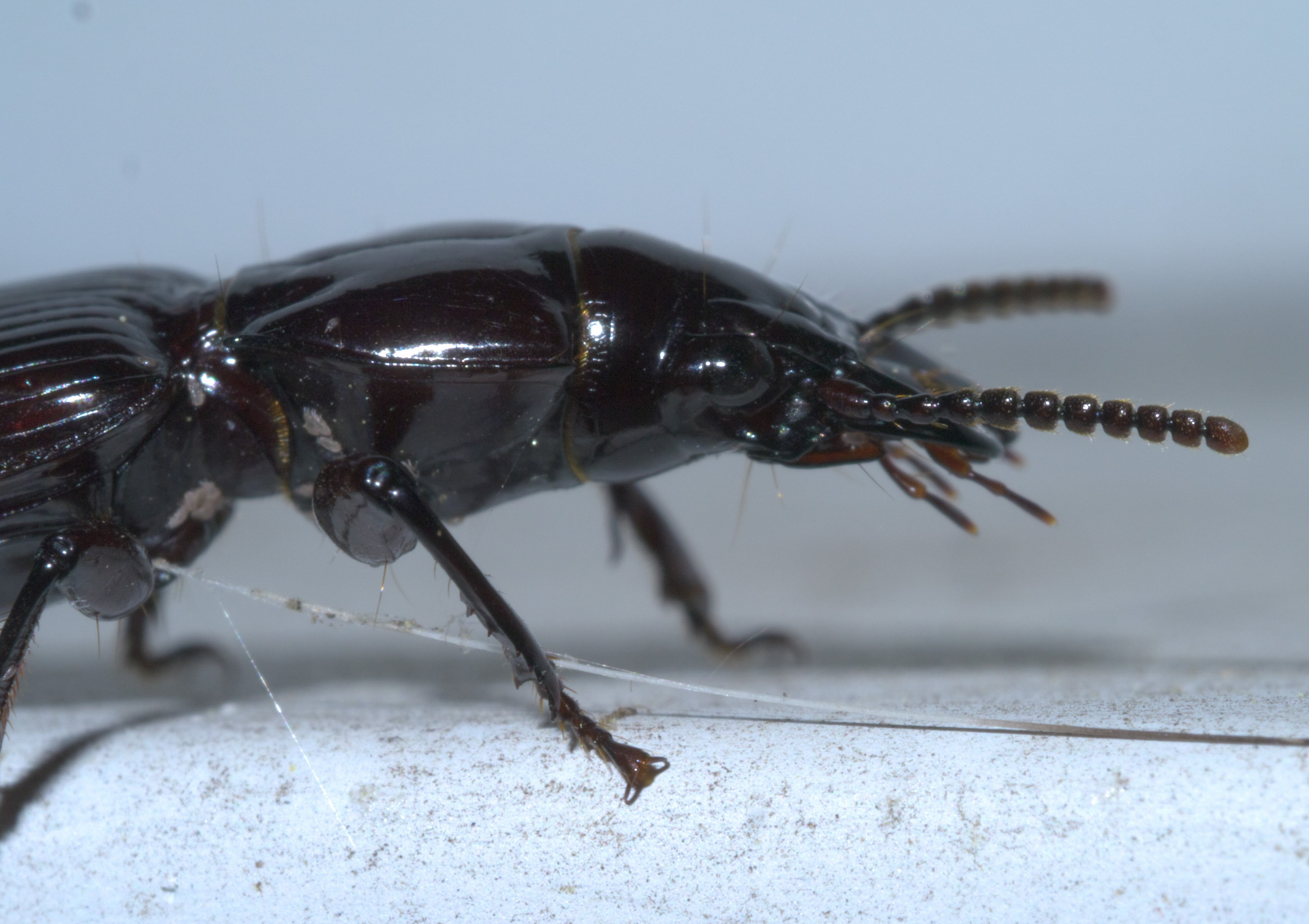

Scientific classification
- Kingdom: Animalia
- Phylum: Arthropoda
- Class: Insecta
- Order: Coleoptera
- Suborder: Adephaga
- Family: Carabidae
- Genus: Morion
- Species: M. monilicornis

Binomial name
- Morion monilicornis (Latreille, 1805)

= Morion monilicornis =

Species of beetle

Morion monilicornis is a species of ground beetle in the family Carabidae. It is found in North America.

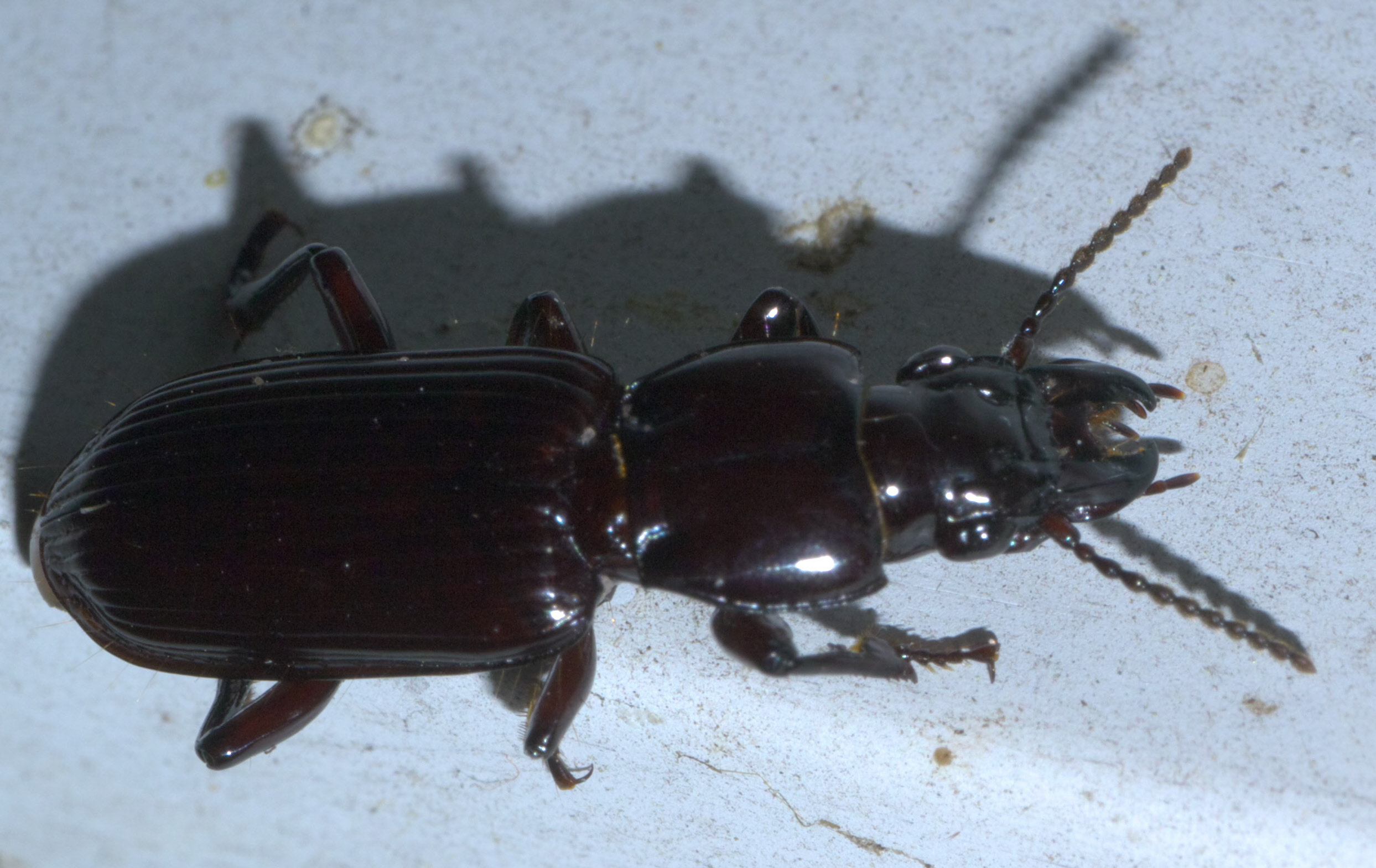
