= Oxyglychus =

Oxyglychus laeviventris

Scientific classification
- Kingdom: Animalia
- Phylum: Arthropoda
- Class: Insecta
- Order: Coleoptera
- Suborder: Adephaga
- Family: Carabidae
- Subfamily: Pterostichinae
- Genus: Oxyglychus; Straneo, 1938
- Species: O. laeviventris

Binomial name
- Oxyglychus laeviventris Bates, 1883

Genus of beetles

Oxyglychus laeviventris is a species of beetle in the family Carabidae, the only species in the genus Oxyglychus.
