= Strigomerodes =

Scientific classification
- Kingdom: Animalia
- Phylum: Arthropoda
- Class: Insecta
- Order: Coleoptera
- Suborder: Adephaga
- Family: Carabidae
- Subfamily: Pterostichinae
- Tribe: Cratocerini
- Subtribe: Drimostomatina
- Genus: Strigomerodes; Straneo, 1939

Genus of beetles

Strigomerodes is a genus in the ground beetle family Carabidae. There are about seven described species in Strigomerodes.

== Species ==
These seven species belong to the genus Strigomerodes:

- Strigomerodes basilewskyi Straneo, 1948 (Kenya)
- Strigomerodes burgeoni (Straneo, 1939) (Cameroon, Equatorial Guinea, DR Congo)
- Strigomerodes laevis (Burgeon, 1935) (DR Congo and Zambia)
- Strigomerodes patrizii Straneo, 1941 (DR Congo)
- Strigomerodes punctifrons Straneo, 1949 (Zimbabwe)
- Strigomerodes singularis (Burgeon, 1935) (DR Congo)
- Strigomerodes uelensis (Burgeon, 1935) (DR Congo and Rwanda)
