= Apsidocnemus =

Scientific classification
- Kingdom: Animalia
- Phylum: Arthropoda
- Class: Insecta
- Order: Coleoptera
- Suborder: Adephaga
- Family: Carabidae
- Subfamily: Pterostichinae
- Genus: Apsidocnemus; Alluaud, 1936

Genus of beetles

Apsidocnemus is a genus of beetles in the family Carabidae, containing the following species:

- Apsidocnemus catalai Alluaud, 1936
- Apsidocnemus gracilitarsis Jeannel, 1948
- Apsidocnemus vadoni Jeannel, 1948
