= Abacaelostus =

Abacaelostus filicornis

Scientific classification
- Kingdom: Animalia
- Phylum: Arthropoda
- Class: Insecta
- Order: Coleoptera
- Suborder: Adephaga
- Family: Carabidae
- Subfamily: Pterostichinae
- Genus: Abacaelostus; Straneo, 1952
- Species: A. filicornis

Binomial name
- Abacaelostus filicornis Straneo, 1952

Genus of beetles

Abacaelostus filicornis is a species of beetle in the family Carabidae, the only species in the genus Abacaelostus.
