= Leleuporites =

Scientific classification
- Kingdom: Animalia
- Phylum: Arthropoda
- Class: Insecta
- Order: Coleoptera
- Suborder: Adephaga
- Family: Carabidae
- Subfamily: Pterostichinae
- Genus: Leleuporites; Straneo, 1960

Genus of beetles

Leleuporites is a genus of beetles in the family Carabidae, containing the following species:

- Leleuporites basilewskyi Straneo, 1960
- Leleuporites mirus (Straneo, 1960)
