= Capabatus =

Scientific classification
- Kingdom: Animalia
- Phylum: Arthropoda
- Class: Insecta
- Order: Coleoptera
- Suborder: Adephaga
- Family: Carabidae
- Tribe: Cratocerini
- Subtribe: Drimostomatina
- Genus: Capabatus; Csiki, 1930
- Species: C. raffrayi

Binomial name
- Capabatus raffrayi (Péringuey, 1898)

Synonyms
- Abatus Péringuey, 1898

Genus of beetles

Capabatus is a genus in the ground beetle family Carabidae. This genus has a single species, Capabatus raffrayi. It is found in South Africa.
