= Megamorio =

Scientific classification
- Domain: Eukaryota
- Kingdom: Animalia
- Phylum: Arthropoda
- Class: Insecta
- Order: Coleoptera
- Suborder: Adephaga
- Family: Carabidae
- Subfamily: Harpalinae
- Tribe: Morionini
- Genus: Megamorio; Chaudoir, 1880

Genus of beetles

Megamorio is a genus in the ground beetle family Carabidae. There are about six described species in Megamorio, found in Africa.

== Species ==
These six species belong to the genus Megamorio:

- Megamorio basilewskyi Straneo, 1949 (DR Congo)
- Megamorio camerunus Straneo, 1949 (Cameroon)
- Megamorio congoensis Straneo, 1949 (DR Congo)
- Megamorio feai Straneo, 1938 (Equatorial Guinea)
- Megamorio gabonicus (Alluaud, 1932) (Ivory Coast, Gabon, DR Congo)
- Megamorio mniszechii (Chaudoir, 1869) (DR Congo)
