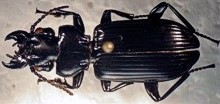

Scientific classification
- Kingdom: Animalia
- Phylum: Arthropoda
- Class: Insecta
- Order: Coleoptera
- Suborder: Adephaga
- Family: Carabidae
- Tribe: Morionini
- Genus: Platynodes; Westwood, 1847
- Species: P. westermanni

Binomial name
- Platynodes westermanni Westwood, 1847

= Platynodes =

Genus of beetles

Platynodes is a genus in the ground beetle family Carabidae. This genus has a single species, Platynodes westermanni. It is found in Ivory Coast, Cameroon, and the Democratic Republic of the Congo.
