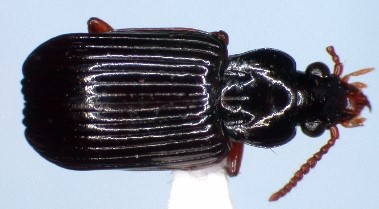
- Stegazopteryx ivimkaensis

Scientific classification
- Domain: Eukaryota
- Kingdom: Animalia
- Phylum: Arthropoda
- Class: Insecta
- Order: Coleoptera
- Suborder: Adephaga
- Family: Carabidae
- Tribe: Cratocerini
- Subtribe: Drimostomatina
- Genus: Stegazopteryx; Will, 2004
- Species: S. ivimkaensis

Binomial name
- Stegazopteryx ivimkaensis Will, 2004

= Stegazopteryx =

Genus of beetles

Stegazopteryx is a genus in the ground beetle family Carabidae. This genus has a single species, Stegazopteryx ivimkaensis. It is found in New Guinea.
