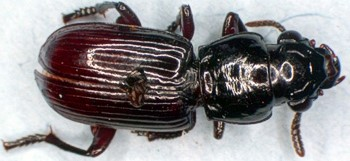
- Morionidius doriae

Scientific classification
- Domain: Eukaryota
- Kingdom: Animalia
- Phylum: Arthropoda
- Class: Insecta
- Order: Coleoptera
- Suborder: Adephaga
- Family: Carabidae
- Subfamily: Harpalinae
- Tribe: Morionini
- Genus: Morionidius; Chaudoir, 1880

= Morionidius =

Genus of beetles

Morionidius is a genus in the beetle family Carabidae. There are about five described species in Morionidius.

== Species ==
These five species belong to the genus Morionidius:

- Morionidius charon Andrewes, 1921 (Thailand, Laos, and Vietnam)
- Morionidius doriae Chaudoir, 1880 (Indonesia, Borneo, New Guinea, and Papua)
- Morionidius erebus Alluaud, 1933 (Vietnam)
- Morionidius inexpectatus Sciaky & Benes, 1997 (China)
- Morionidius insularis Kasahara & Ohtani, 1992 (Japan)
