= Homalomorpha =

Scientific classification
- Domain: Eukaryota
- Kingdom: Animalia
- Phylum: Arthropoda
- Class: Insecta
- Order: Coleoptera
- Suborder: Adephaga
- Family: Carabidae
- Tribe: Cratocerini
- Subtribe: Catapieseina
- Genus: Homalomorpha; Brullé, 1837
- Species: H. castanea

Binomial name
- Homalomorpha castanea Brullé, 1837

Synonyms
- Geta Putzeys, 1845

Genus of beetles

Homalomorpha is a genus in the ground beetle family Carabidae. This genus has a single species, Homalomorpha castanea. It is found in Central and South America.
