= Hyperectenus =

Scientific classification
- Domain: Eukaryota
- Kingdom: Animalia
- Phylum: Arthropoda
- Class: Insecta
- Order: Coleoptera
- Suborder: Adephaga
- Family: Carabidae
- Subfamily: Harpalinae
- Tribe: Morionini
- Genus: Hyperectenus; Alluaud, 1935

Genus of beetles

Hyperectenus is a genus in the ground beetle family Carabidae. There are at least two described species in Hyperectenus, found in Africa.

== Species ==
These two species belong to the genus Hyperectenus:

- Hyperectenus aenigmaticus Alluaud, 1935 (Ivory Coast, Cameroon)
- Hyperectenus minor Britton, 1946 (Ghana)
