= Stereostoma =

Scientific classification
- Domain: Eukaryota
- Kingdom: Animalia
- Phylum: Arthropoda
- Class: Insecta
- Order: Coleoptera
- Suborder: Adephaga
- Family: Carabidae
- Subfamily: Harpalinae
- Tribe: Morionini
- Genus: Stereostoma; Murray, 1857

Subgenera
- Stereodema Chaudoir, 1873; Stereostoma Murray, 1857

Genus of beetles

Stereostoma is a genus in the beetle family Carabidae. There are more than 20 described species in Stereostoma, found in Africa.

== Species ==
These 28 species belong to the genus Stereostoma:

- Stereostoma angolense G.Müller, 1940
- Stereostoma balbisi G.Müller, 1940
- Stereostoma camerunum G.Müller, 1940
- Stereostoma clarkei Straneo, 1979
- Stereostoma conradti G.Müller, 1940
- Stereostoma corpulentum (Chaudoir, 1873)
- Stereostoma ertli G.Müller, 1940
- Stereostoma erythraeum G.Müller, 1940
- Stereostoma girardi Straneo, 1986
- Stereostoma guineense G.Müller, 1940
- Stereostoma hirtipenne G.Müller, 1940
- Stereostoma incisum Straneo, 1991
- Stereostoma ingens G.Müller, 1940
- Stereostoma interstitiale Straneo, 1979
- Stereostoma jeanneli Alluaud, 1933
- Stereostoma kuntzeni G.Müller, 1940
- Stereostoma praecellens G.Müller, 1941
- Stereostoma punctatum Straneo, 1958
- Stereostoma punctisternum Straneo, 1951
- Stereostoma rhodesianum Straneo, 1946
- Stereostoma sansibaricum G.Müller, 1940
- Stereostoma senegalense G.Müller, 1940
- Stereostoma solidum Murray, 1857
- Stereostoma stuhlmanni Kolbe, 1895
- Stereostoma tenebrioides (J.Thomson, 1858)
- Stereostoma titschacki G.Müller, 1940
- Stereostoma usambaricum G.Müller, 1940
- Stereostoma whitei Murray, 1857
