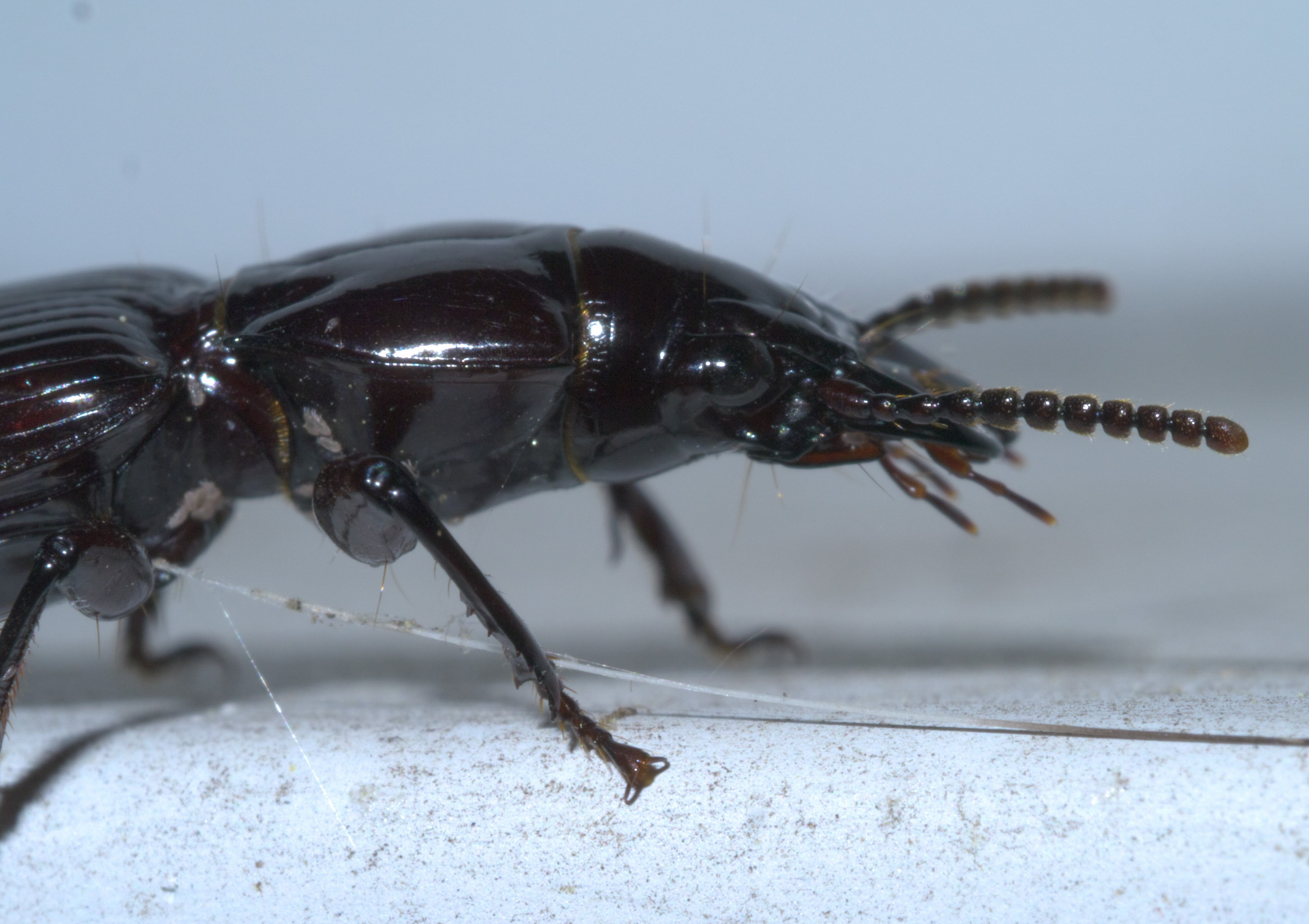
- Morion monilicornis

Scientific classification
- Kingdom: Animalia
- Phylum: Arthropoda
- Class: Insecta
- Order: Coleoptera
- Suborder: Adephaga
- Family: Carabidae
- Subfamily: Harpalinae
- Tribe: Morionini
- Genus: Morion; Latreille, 1810

= Morion (beetle) =

Genus of beetles

Morion is a genus of in the beetle family Carabidae. There are more than 40 described species in Morion.

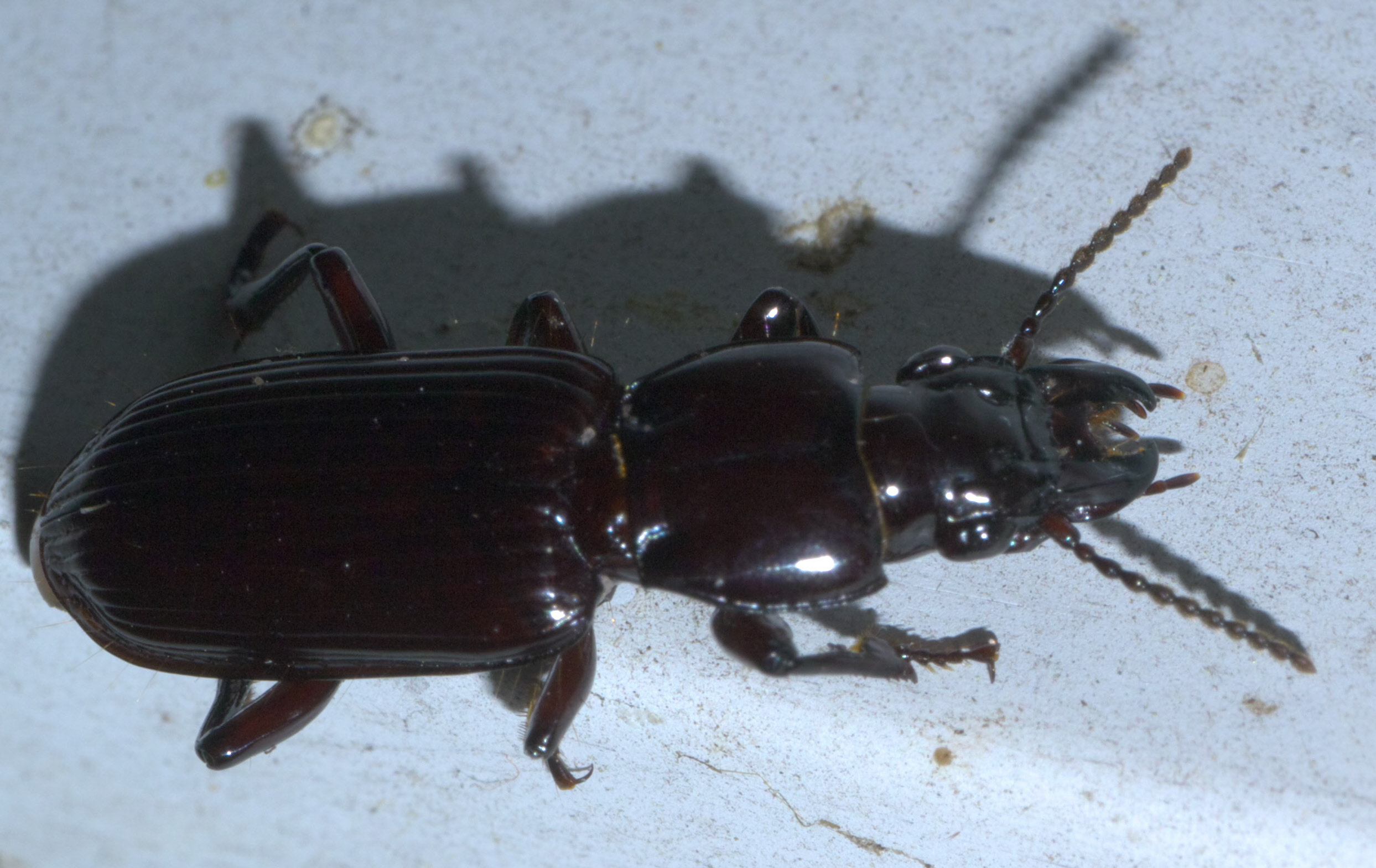
Morion monilicornis

== Species ==
These 41 species belong to the genus Morion:

- Morion angustus Chaudoir, 1880 (Philippines)
- Morion aridus Allen, 1969 (the United States)
- Morion attenuatus Barker, 1922 (Africa)
- Morion australis Laporte, 1867 (Australia)
- Morion baloghi Horvatovich, 1976 (New Guinea)
- Morion biroi Horvatovich, 1976 (New Guinea)
- Morion bithynicus Schauberger, 1925 (Turkey)
- Morion boliviensis Allen, 1969 (Bolivia)
- Morion boninensis Kasahara & Satô, 1990 (Japan)
- Morion brasiliensis Dejean, 1825 (Brazil)
- Morion brevior Putzeys, 1873 (Indonesia and Borneo)
- Morion caledoniae Fauvel, 1903 (New Caledonia)
- Morion congoensis Straneo, 1959 (Africa)
- Morion constrictus Chaudoir, 1880 (Guinea and Tanzania)
- Morion cordatus Chaudoir, 1837 (Mexico)
- Morion costigerus Darlington, 1934 (the Lesser Antilles)
- Morion crassipes Sloane, 1904 (Australia)
- Morion cucujoides Walker, 1858 (Indomalaya)
- Morion cyclomus Chaudoir, 1854 (Colombia and Brazil)
- Morion dalbertisi Chaudoir, 1880 (Indonesia, New Guinea, and Australia)
- Morion doriae Putzeys, 1873 (Indonesia and Borneo)
- Morion germanus Chaudoir, 1880 (Australia)
- Morion guineensis Imhoff, 1843 (Africa)
- Morion humeratus Chaudoir, 1880 (Indonesia, New Guinea, and the Solomon Islands)
- Morion japonicus Bates, 1883 (Japan)
- Morion jordani Csiki, 1929 (Indonesia)
- Morion lafertei Guérin-Méneville, 1844 (Venezuela and Mexico)
- Morion longicollis W.J.MacLeay, 1871 (Australia)
- Morion longipennis Putzeys, 1875 (Indonesia, New Guinea, and Australia)
- Morion luzonicus Chaudoir, 1852 (Indomalaya)
- Morion monilicornis (Latreille, 1805) (North, Central, and South America)
- Morion novaehollandiae Laporte, 1867 (Australia)
- Morion olympicus L.Redtenbacher, 1843 (Europe and Asia)
- Morion orientalis Dejean, 1825 (Africa, Southeast Asia)
- Morion pachysomus Chaudoir, 1880 (Australia)
- Morion parallelus Klug, 1833 (Madagascar)
- Morion piceus Laporte, 1867 (Australia)
- Morion polynesiae Fairmaire, 1878 (Fiji)
- Morion simplex Dejean, 1826 (Central and South America)
- Morion simulatus Jordan, 1894 (Indonesia)
- Morion victoriae Laporte, 1867 (Australia)
