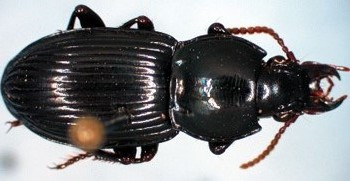
- Moriosomus seticollis

Scientific classification
- Kingdom: Animalia
- Phylum: Arthropoda
- Class: Insecta
- Order: Coleoptera
- Suborder: Adephaga
- Family: Carabidae
- Subfamily: Harpalinae
- Tribe: Morionini
- Genus: Moriosomus; Motschulsky, 1855

= Moriosomus =

Genus of beetles

Moriosomus is a genus in the beetle family Carabidae. There are at least four described species in Moriosomus.

== Species ==
These four species belong to the genus Moriosomus:

- Moriosomus loebli Allegro; Giachino & Picciau, 2018 (Turkmenistan)
- Moriosomus motschulskyi Erwin & W.Moore, 2007 (Peru)
- Moriosomus seticollis Straneo, 1985 (Colombia)
- Moriosomus sylvestris Motschulsky, 1855 (Panama, Costa Rica, and Nicaragua)
