= Madapelmus =

Scientific classification
- Domain: Eukaryota
- Kingdom: Animalia
- Phylum: Arthropoda
- Class: Insecta
- Order: Coleoptera
- Suborder: Adephaga
- Family: Carabidae
- Tribe: Cratocerini
- Subtribe: Drimostomatina
- Genus: Madapelmus; Dajoz, 1985
- Species: M. elongatus

Binomial name
- Madapelmus elongatus Dajoz, 1985

Genus of beetles

Madapelmus is a genus in the beetle family Carabidae. This genus has a single species, Madapelmus elongatus. It is found in Madagascar.
