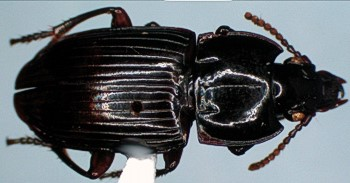

Scientific classification
- Kingdom: Animalia
- Phylum: Arthropoda
- Class: Insecta
- Order: Coleoptera
- Suborder: Adephaga
- Family: Carabidae
- Subfamily: Pterostichinae
- Genus: Buderes; Murray, 1857
- Species: B. oberti

Binomial name
- Buderes oberti Murray, 1857

= Buderes =

Buderes oberti

Genus of beetles

Buderes oberti is a species of beetles in the family Carabidae, the only species in the genus Buderes.
