= Chaetodactyla =

Scientific classification
- Domain: Eukaryota
- Kingdom: Animalia
- Phylum: Arthropoda
- Class: Insecta
- Order: Coleoptera
- Suborder: Adephaga
- Family: Carabidae
- Subfamily: Pterostichinae
- Tribe: Chaetodactylini
- Genus: Chaetodactyla; Tschitscherine, 1897

Subgenera
- Chaetodactyla Tschitscherine, 1897; Jeannelina Deuve, 1983; Tshitsherinella Semenov, 1905

Genus of beetles

Chaetodactyla is a genus in the beetle family Carabidae. There are more than 20 described species in Chaetodactyla, found in Madagascar.

== Species ==
These 25 species belong to the genus Chaetodactyla:

- Chaetodactyla alluaudi Tschitscherine, 1899
- Chaetodactyla basilewskyi Deuve, 1983
- Chaetodactyla brancsiki (Tschitscherine, 1898)
- Chaetodactyla catalai (Jeannel, 1948)
- Chaetodactyla decorsei (Tschitscherine, 1903)
- Chaetodactyla descarpentriesi Deuve, 1980
- Chaetodactyla feronioides (Tschitscherine, 1897)
- Chaetodactyla kavanaughi Deuve, 2015
- Chaetodactyla lambertoni Deuve, 1983
- Chaetodactyla lambertonioides Deuve & Kavanaugh, 2015
- Chaetodactyla microphthalma Deuve & Rainio, 2015
- Chaetodactyla mirabilis Tschitscherine, 1897
- Chaetodactyla olsoufieffi (Alluaud, 1935)
- Chaetodactyla pauliani (Jeannel, 1955)
- Chaetodactyla peyrierasi Deuve, 1980
- Chaetodactyla rainioae Deuve & Kavanaugh, 2015
- Chaetodactyla ranomofana Deuve & Rainio, 2015
- Chaetodactyla robusta Deuve, 1980
- Chaetodactyla seyrigi (Alluaud, 1935)
- Chaetodactyla simulans Deuve, 1983
- Chaetodactyla sinuaticollis Deuve, 1980
- Chaetodactyla sphodroides Deuve, 1980
- Chaetodactyla striatipennis Deuve, 1983
- Chaetodactyla thoracica (Jeannel, 1948)
- Chaetodactyla vicina Deuve, 1980
