= Hoplizomenus =

Scientific classification
- Domain: Eukaryota
- Kingdom: Animalia
- Phylum: Arthropoda
- Class: Insecta
- Order: Coleoptera
- Suborder: Adephaga
- Family: Carabidae
- Tribe: Cratocerini
- Subtribe: Drimostomatina
- Genus: Hoplizomenus; Chaudoir, 1873
- Species: H. carinatus

Binomial name
- Hoplizomenus carinatus Chaudoir, 1873

Genus of beetles

Hoplizomenus is a genus in the ground beetle family Carabidae. This genus has a single species, Hoplizomenus carinatus. It is found in the African countries Guinea, Cameroon, and the Republic of the Congo.
