= Monodryxus =

Scientific classification
- Kingdom: Animalia
- Phylum: Arthropoda
- Class: Insecta
- Order: Coleoptera
- Suborder: Adephaga
- Family: Carabidae
- Tribe: Cratocerini
- Subtribe: Drimostomatina
- Genus: Monodryxus; Straneo, 1942
- Species: M. crassus

Binomial name
- Monodryxus crassus (Straneo, 1941)

Genus of beetles

Monodryxus is a genus in the ground beetle family Carabidae. This genus has a single species, Monodryxus crassus. It is found in Príncipe.
