= List of puzzle topics =

This is a list of puzzle topics, by Wikipedia page.

== Puzzles, by type ==
- Brain teaser
- Chess puzzle
  - Chess problem
- Computer puzzle game
- Cross Sums
- Crossword puzzle
- Cryptic crossword
- Cryptogram
- Maze
  - Back from the klondike
  - Ball-in-a-maze puzzle
- Mechanical puzzle
  - Ball-in-a-maze puzzle
  - Burr puzzle
- Word puzzle
  - Acrostic
- Daughter in the box
- Disentanglement puzzle
- Edge-matching puzzle
- Egg of Columbus
- Eight queens puzzle
- Einstein's Puzzle
- Eternity puzzle
- Fifteen puzzle
- Fox, goose and bag of beans puzzle
- Geomagic square
- Globe puzzle
- Graeco-Latin square
- Gry
- Happy Cube
- Induction puzzles
- Insight
- Jigsaw puzzle
- Kakuro
- KenKen
- Knights and knaves
- Knight's Tour
- Lateral thinking
- Latin square
- Letter bank
- Lock puzzle
- Logic puzzle
- Magic square
- Mahjong solitaire
- Matchstick puzzle
- Mathematical puzzle
- Merkle's Puzzles
- Minus Cube
- Morpion solitaire
- N-puzzle
- National Puzzlers' League
- Nikoli
- Nine dots puzzle
- Nob Yoshigahara Puzzle Design Competition
- Nurikabe (puzzle)
- Packing problem
- Paint by numbers
- Peg solitaire
- Pentomino
- Pirate loot problem
- Plate-and-ring puzzle
- Problem solving
- Rattle puzzle
- Rebus
- Riddles
- Rubik's Cube
  - Speedcubing
  - Pocket Cube
- Rubik's Magic
- Rubik's Revenge
- Rush Hour (puzzle)
- Situation puzzle
- Sliding puzzle
- Snake cube
- Sokoban
- Soma cube
- Sphere packing
- Stick puzzle
- Sudoku
- Tangram
- Three-cottage problem
- Three cups problem
- Tiling puzzle
- Tour puzzle
- Tower of Hanoi
- T puzzle
- Tsumego
- Tsumeshogi
- Verbal arithmetic
- Wire puzzle
- Wire-and-string puzzle
- XYZZY Award for Best Individual Puzzle

== People ==
- Araucaria
- Emily Cox
- Henry Dudeney
- Tony Fisher
- Martin Gardner
- Scott Kim
- Lloyd King
- Sam Loyd
- Uwe Mèffert
- Larry D. Nichols
- Henry Rathvon
- Tom M. Rodgers
- Ernő Rubik
- Mike Selinker
- Will Shortz
- Jerry Slocum
- Stephen Sondheim
- Oskar van Deventer
- Nob Yoshigahara
- Kit Williams
- Arthur Wynne

== See also ==
- Anagram
