= Stewart Coffin =

American puzzle maker

Stewart Coffin is an American puzzle maker. According to Ars Technica, he is considered to be one of the "best designers of polyhedral interlocking puzzles in the world."

== Biography ==
Coffin majored in electrical engineering in college at the University of Massachusetts at Amherst where he graduated in 1953. He worked at the Lincoln Laboratory at the Massachusetts Institute of Technology (MIT) building computers from 1953 through 1958. In 1964, he left electronics to start building canoes and other boats. He and his family moved to a farm in Lincoln, Massachusetts.

Coffin currently lives in Carlisle, Massachusetts, where he moved to in 2021. He has three daughters, all of whom are very good at solving his puzzles.

== Work ==
Coffin began creating puzzles in 1968, after quitting the design and manufacture of canoes and kayaks. One of the puzzles he created, made of 12 hexagonal sticks and cast in epoxy, was brought to school by one of his three daughters. This event led to Coffin meeting Thomas Atwater who was a business agent for inventors of games and puzzles. When 3M showed an interest in his work, he decided to quit making boats and concentrate on puzzles. Hectix, one of his designs, was patented in the United States in 1973 and then manufactured by 3M. When they were manufactured, the design was so complex that factory workers were unable to assemble them. The parts were shipped to his Lincoln residence where he, his daughters and neighborhood children all put them together, making 20,000 puzzles in two weeks.

Later, Coffin stopped patenting his puzzles because he did not feel he could make a living by designing products for mass production. Instead he turned to woodworking and selling his puzzles as an art or a craft.

Coffin has designed more than 500 original puzzles, most of which are polyhedral. Some have been commercially produced, such as the Hectix. Most of his designs are crafted in wood, some of which use exotic woods such as cocobolo, bubinga and rosewood. In creating his wooden puzzles, Coffin selects beautiful types of wood, cuts and glues the work and then adds his own finish to the piece. Coffin has had no formal training in puzzle making and designs his works intuitively.

Coffin's puzzles have several rules, including that each piece be dissimilar, have different axes of symmetry and only one solution. He has freely shared his designs for reproduction, making his puzzles widely produced and sold internationally.

Coffin has called his work "AP-ART," "the sculptural art that comes apart" and he feels that the "ultimate object in puzzle design is amusement." Curator, Amy Slocum, has highlighted the artistic effort that Coffin puts into his work when she exhibited several pieces at the Katonah Museum of Art. Jerry Slocum, the founder of the International Puzzle Party, has called Coffin's puzzles "beautiful three-dimensional sculptures."

In 2000, Coffin was the winner of the Sam Loyd Award. In 2006, he won the Nob Yoshigahara Award for his lifetime contribution to creating mechanical puzzles.

In 2007, Coffin spoke at the American Association for the Advancement of Science (AAAS) in Boston, where he discussed his puzzle making and demonstrated his puzzles.

== Books ==
He is the author of several books and articles about puzzles, puzzle design and memoirs of his life:

- Puzzle Craft. Lincoln, Massachusetts: Stewart T. Coffin. 1985. OCLC 8262551.
- The Puzzling World of Polyhedral Dissections. New York: Oxford University Press. 1990. ISBN 9780198532071.
- AP-Art: A Compendium of Puzzle Designs. with Jerry Slocum. Oregonia, Ohio: Puzzle World Producations. 2003. ISBN 9780966636123.
- "What's New in Polyomino Puzzles and Their Design". Mathematical Properties of Sequences and Other Combinatorial Structures. with Jerry Slocum and edited by Jong-Seon No and Hong-Yeop Song. New York: Kluwer Academic Publishers. 2003. ISBN 9781461503040.
- Tall Trees and Wild Bees: Memories of Childhood That Never Really Ended. with Jerry Slocum. Amherst, Massachusetts: Collective Copies. 2006. ISBN 9780977045402.
- Geometric Puzzle Design (2nd ed.). Wellesley, Massachusetts: A K Peters, Ltd. 2007. ISBN 9781568813127.
- Black Spruce Journals: Tales of Canoe-Tripping in the Maine Woods, the Boreal Spruce Forests of Northern Canada and the Barren Grounds. Heron Dance Press. 2007. ISBN 978-1933937403.
- Tipcart Tales. Amherst, Massachusetts: Collective Copies. 2007. ISBN 9780977045426.
- AP-ART, A Compendium of Geometric Puzzles (2014)

== Excerpts ==
The Universal Book of Mathematics provides the following information about him:

A leading designer of mechanical puzzles. He is also the author of The Puzzling World of Polyhedral Dissections, one of the most significant works produced on this subject.
