= Famous Trick Donkeys =

Puzzle invented by Sam Loyd in 1858

Sam Loyd's "Famous Trick Donkeys" puzzle. The solver must cut out the three rectangles and reassemble the pieces so that the two jockeys appear to be riding the two donkeys.

Famous Trick Donkeys is a puzzle invented by Sam Loyd in 1858, first printed on a card supposed to promote P.T. Barnum's circus. At that time, the puzzle was first called "P.T. Barnum's Trick Mules". Millions of cards were sold, with an estimated income for Sam Loyd of $10,000 from 1871—more than $200,000 in 2023 dollars.

== History ==
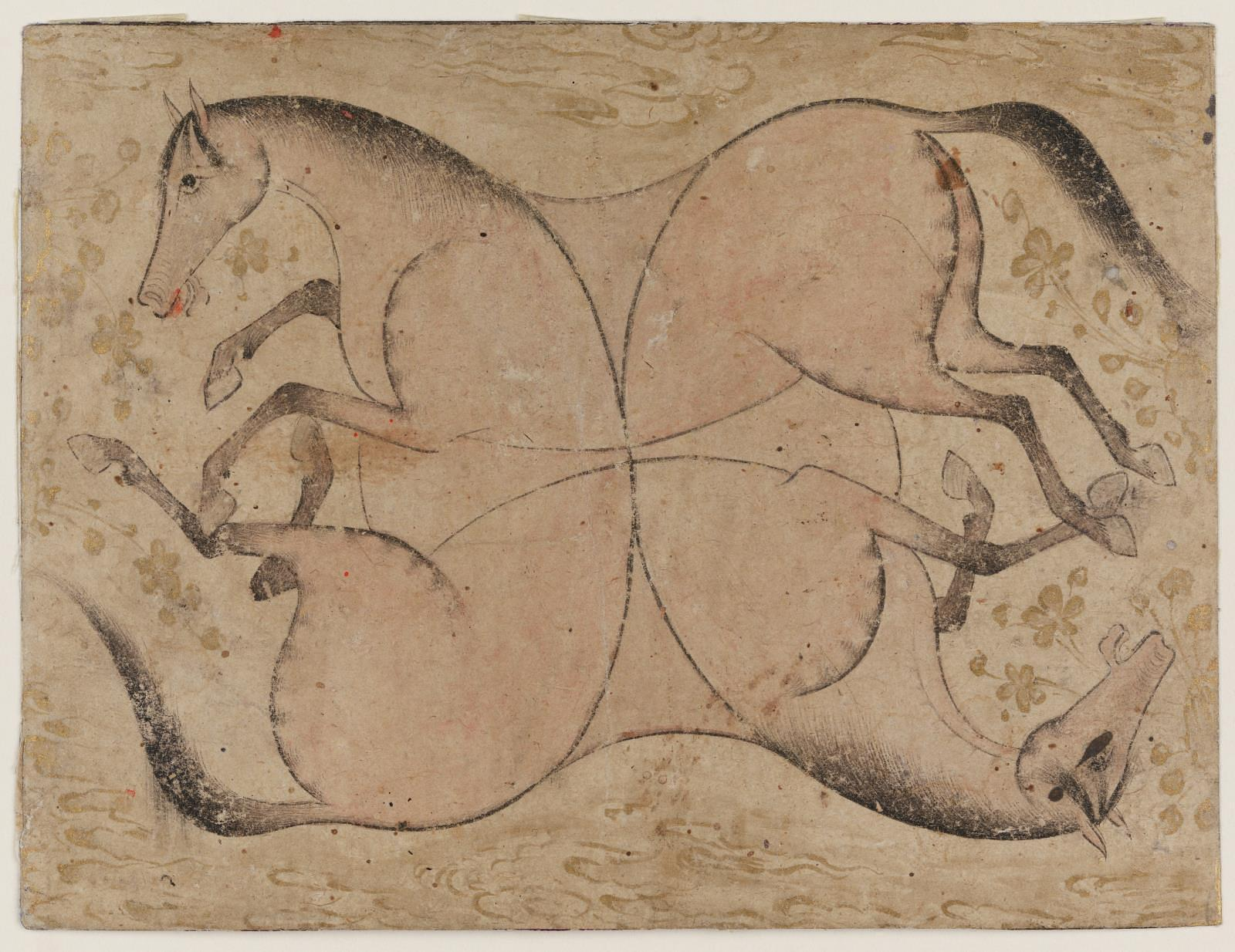
Ink on paper from the Safavid period, early 17th century. (Nr. 14.629 in the Museum of Fine Arts, Boston.)

According to Martin Gardner, the puzzle may have been inspired by a 17th-century Persian design, currently in the Museum of Fine Arts, Boston. (It was purchased by the museum in 1914 from Victor Goloubew. The latter acquired it in 1912 and exhibited it in Paris.)

In 1858, Sam Loyd says he thought of a puzzle card that consisted on two mules and two riders. Dividing the card into three pieces, the player had to place the cards in a way that each mule had one rider on. In 1871, after he had published The Wonderful Chinese Pony Puzzle, Sam decided to publish his mules puzzle, renaming it the "Puzzle of the Trick Mules".

P. T. Barnum saw the opportunity to promote his show on this puzzle card and offered ten thousand dollars to Sam Loyd to change the name of the puzzle to "P.T. Barnum's Trick Mules" Later on, and after Loyd had offered the puzzle to other firms, it was renamed again to "Famous Trick Donkeys", which sold more than 100,000,000 copies. Today The Sam Loyd Company owns the rights to the puzzle and released a commemorative puzzle card in 2016, 145 years after it was first published.

== Puzzle ==
The printed card of the puzzle shows two donkeys, the central part of which has been left blank on purpose. The third part of the card are the riders, and the objective of the puzzle is to arrange the three pieces (the two donkeys and the riders) so the riders are mounted on the donkeys' backs.

== Variations ==
In the 1857 version of the book The Magician's Own Book or the Whole Art of Conjuring there appears a picture of two dogs lying on the ground facing opposite sides. Called "The Dead Dog Puzzle" the objective was to draw 2 lines which make the dogs seem to be alive, instead of lying on the ground. In 1939, another variation of the puzzle was found as a prize of a popcorn company in their packages, the puzzle showed two mules and two cowboys. This time, the mechanics of the game were the same as Sam Loyd's, other companies used a tiny card with this puzzle as a gift, like the Hotel Wellington in Albany in the 50s.

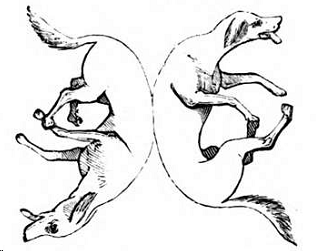
"The Dead Dog Puzzle"

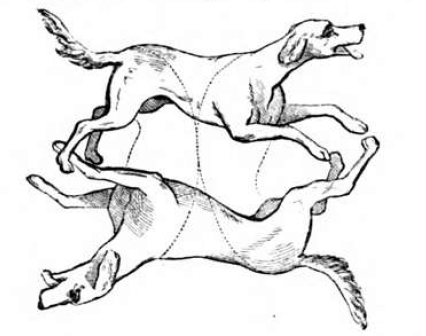
"The Dead Dog Puzzle" solution

Today, many puzzle and mind-teasers websites offer the puzzle as an online game or a print-friendly version of it.

== Solution ==
The solution

The solution for the puzzle is that, of the two horses drawn, the head and back of each is not the one linked with lines. The back of the top horse, when the puzzle is solved, becomes the back of the horse on the other side of the card and vice versa. To solve the puzzle, the two horse pieces are placed in a way that the back of the horse on the first piece is facing the front of the horse on the second piece. In the gap between, the jockey's piece of paper should be slipped in, thus forming an image on which a horse is running to the left and the other to the right, one upside up, and the other upside down.
