= Oskar Schlömilch =

German mathematician (1823–1901)

- Born: 13 April 1823; Weimar
- Died: 7 February 1901 (aged 77)
- Education: University of Jena
- Scientific career
- Fields: Mathematics
- Thesis: Theorema taylorianum (1844)

Oskar Xavier Schlömilch (13 April 1823 – 7 February 1901) was a German mathematician, born in Weimar, working in mathematical analysis. He took a doctorate at the University of Jena in 1842, and became a professor at Dresden Polytechnic in 1849.

He is now known as the eponym of the Schlömilch function, a kind of Bessel function. He was also an important textbook writer, and editor of the journal Zeitschrift für Mathematik und Physik, of which he was a founder in 1856. He published in 1868 for the first time the dissection paradox, earlier invented by Sam Loyd.

In 1862, he was elected a foreign member of the Royal Swedish Academy of Sciences.

== See also ==
- Cauchy–Schlömilch transformation
- Schlömilch's series
- Schömilch form of the remainder
- Cauchy condensation test § Schlömilch's generalization
- Paradox of Loyd and Schlömilch
