= Vanishing puzzle =

Optical illusion

Interactive SVG of The Disappearing Bicyclist – in the SVG file, move the pointer to rotate the disc

A vanishing puzzle is a mechanical optical illusion comprising multiple pieces which can be rearranged to show different versions of a picture depicting several objects, the number of which depending on the arrangement of the pieces.

== History ==
Interactive SVG of The Magic Egg Puzzle – in the SVG file, move the pointer to cycle its upper half

Wemple & Company marketed an advertising card named The Magic Egg Puzzle, (How Many Eggs?) in New York in 1880. Cutting the rectangular card into four oblongs allowed the pieces to be rearranged to show either 8, 9 or 10 eggs. Many other similar puzzles have been published since.

Chess player and recreational mathematician Sam Loyd patented rotary vanishing puzzles in 1896 and published versions named Get Off the Earth, Teddy and the Lion and The Disappearing Bicyclist (pictured). Each had a circular card connected to a cardboard backdrop with a pin, letting it freely rotate. In The Disappearing Bicyclist, when the disc is rotated such that the arrow points to A, 13 boys can be counted, but when it points to B, there are only 12 boys.

Simplified rotary (left column) and sliding (right column) vanishing puzzles showing 2, 3 or 4 bars depending on the position of the moving part (yellow)

Prizes from $5 to $100 were offered for the best explanation of one illusion. Though the names of the winners were published, their explanations were not.

== Similar puzzles ==
The missing square puzzle is an optical illusion used in mathematics classes to help students reason about geometrical figures; or rather to teach them not to reason using figures, but to use only textual descriptions and the axioms of geometry. It depicts two arrangements made of similar shapes in slightly different configurations. Each apparently forms a 13×5 right-angled triangle, but one has a 1×1 hole in it.

Both "total triangles" are in a perfect 13×5 grid; and both the "component triangles", the blue in a 5×2 grid and the red in an 8×3 grid

Sam Loyd's paradoxical dissection

A variant of Mitsunobu Matsuyama's "paradox"

Sam Loyd's chessboard paradox demonstrates two rearrangements of an 8×8 square. In the "larger" rearrangement (the 5×13 rectangle in the image to the right), the gaps between the figures have a combined unit square more area than their square gaps counterparts, creating an illusion that the figures there take up more space than those in the original square figure.

== See also ==
- Missing square puzzle
- Chessboard paradox
- Einstellung effect
- Hooper's paradox
- Missing dollar riddle
