= David Darling =

David Darling may refer to:

- David Darling (businessman) (born 1966), British video game developer
- David Darling (musician) (1941–2021), American cellist and composer
- David J. Darling (born 1953), British science writer and astronomer
- Dave Darling (born 1958), American musician and record producer
