= Kagen Sound =

- Born: Kagen Schaefer
- Education: Colorado College
- Occupation: Puzzle artist
- Notable work: Pipe Organ Desk, Lotus Table, Maze Burr

Kagen Sound (formerly Schaefer) is an American puzzle box and puzzle furniture craftsman, and is recognized as a leader in these fields.

Sound has developed a worldwide following, and is recognized as a Friend of the Karakuri Creation Group, the world's only puzzle box guild, and remains the only member of this group to be of non-Japanese origin (as of June 2017). He has won more awards at the annual International Puzzle Party (IPP) than any other designer.

== Early life ==
Sound spent his childhood in Colorado, at which time he developed an interest in mathematics. He would often draw elaborate mazes in primary school, and was first introduced to puzzle boxes by a fellow student in his first-grade class. He began designing his own puzzle boxes in middle school.

After completing high school, Sound attended Colorado College, where he received a mathematics degree in 2000. He then began working as a teaching assistant in the college's mathematics department, as well as assisting in the art department's woodworking studio. After his first win at the Nob Yoshigahara Puzzle Design Competition in 2002, Sound took a series of woodworking jobs in Los Angeles and Denver, before relocating to Portland to focus on improving his skills. He returned to Denver in 2005.

== Career ==
Sound's work has attracted celebrity attention, with film director Darren Aronofsky commissioning him in 2007 to create a custom work known as the Pipe Organ Desk. (Note: Though no known source explicitly states that Darren Aronofsky owns the Pipe Organ Desk, the New Yorker article ‘Heavy Weather’ makes reference to his owning a desk which shares a number of specific defining characteristics with it, including the fact that it is custom-built; is made of woods such as Bastogne walnut and pink ivory, both of which are extremely rare; its drawers have the ability to play an octave of musical notes when slid in and out; the presence of over 20 other puzzles; and the fact that to open the final safe the correct tune must be played by the drawers. The buyer was also described as “a famous filmmaker, a man known for making dark, psychological thrillers” who lives in New York City. It can therefore be concluded that Aronofsky’s desk is indeed the Pipe Organ Desk.) The desk took a total of four years to design and build, reaching completion in 2011, and is made from exotic woods such as South African pink ivory, Lignum vitae, and Bastogne walnut—one of the world's most valuable woods. The total cost of materials equated to approximately $10,000 (USD), and was sold for the price of a “nice car”. He experienced a significant increase in demand in 2012, when Fine Woodworking magazine published an article about the desk.

Another notable design of Sound's is the Lotus Table, the top of which is composed of ten concentric rings of inlaid wood which must be rotated to create geometric patterns. If the correct patterns are formed, drawers will open in sequence, resulting in the table resembling a lotus flower. The first prototype of this table was completed in 2010, after development since at least 2008. This design was also transferred across to a series of boxes beginning with a prototype in 2011 and later consisting of the Caterpillar, Lotus, and Butterfly boxes.

His most popular and repeated design is the Maze Burr and its variations. It was originally made in 2006, when it was declared “Puzzle of the Year” by the IPP judging committee. Five batches of this design and its variations have been produced in total, with the latest in 2011 (as of June 2017).

His woodshop is currently located at Ironton Studios and Galleries in Denver, Colorado.

== Personal life ==
Sound married his wife Megan in 2013, at which time they both changed their last names to Sound, citing the common phrases “sound of character” and “structurally sound” as reasons for this. They were divorced in 2023.

== Awards and achievements ==
Sound received awards in the Nob Yoshigahara Puzzle Design Competition in 2002 for the Block Box (first place and People's Choice Award), in 2003 for the Decorated Box (Honorable Mention), in 2004 for the Dodecahedron Box (Grand Prize and People's Choice Award), and in 2006 for the Maze Burr (Grand Prize and People's Choice Award). In 2009 he received the Sam Loyd Award for promoting interest in mechanical puzzles from the Association of Game and Puzzle Collectors.
