= Lloyd King =

L(l)oyd King may refer to:

- Lloyd King (puzzle designer).
- Lloyd J. King (1906–1998), American businessman and founder of the grocery chain King Soopers.
- Loyd King (born 1949), American basketball player.
