= Early history of animation =

History of animation before the emergence of celluloid film

The early history of animation covers the period up to 1888, when celluloid film base was developed, a technology that would become the foundation for over a century of film. Humans have probably attempted to depict motion long before the development of cinematography. Shadow play and the magic lantern (since circa 1659) had already offered popular shows with projected images on a screen, moving as the result of manipulation by hand and/or minor mechanics. In 1833, the stroboscopic disc (better known as the phenakistiscope) introduced the stroboscopic principles of modern animation, which decades later would also provide the basis for cinematography.

== Early approaches to motion in art ==
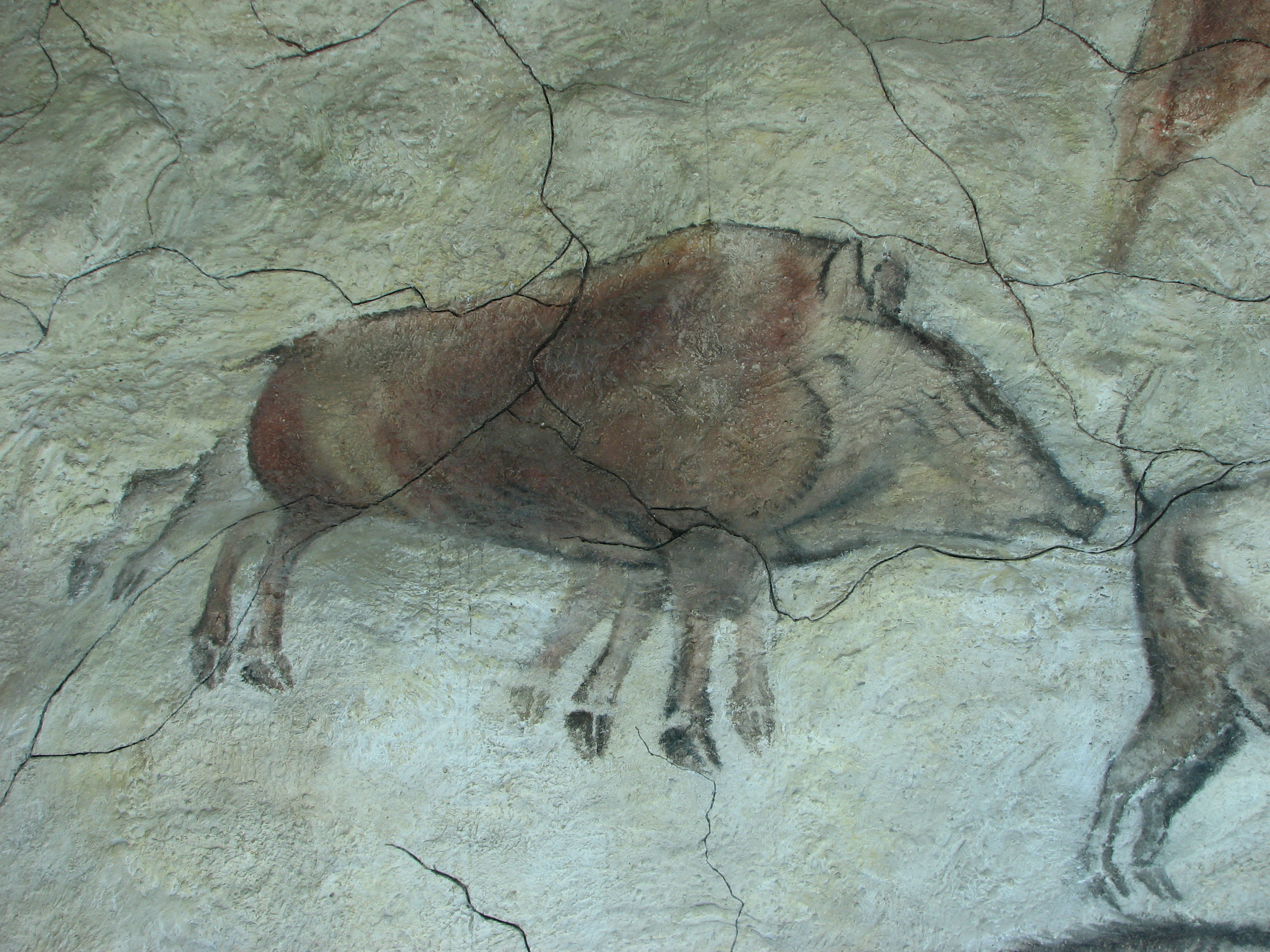
Copy of a prehistoric cave painting from the Altamira Cave depicting an eight-legged boar, which has been interpreted as an early attempt at depicting motion

There are several examples of early sequential images that may seem similar to series of animation drawings. Most of these examples would only allow an extremely low frame rate when they are animated, resulting in short and crude animations that are not very lifelike. No evidence for any animation technology has been found with sequential images from before the 19th century (neither in artifacts nor in written sources). It is sometimes argued that sequential art has been too easily interpreted as "pre-cinema" by minds accustomed to films, comic books and other modern examples, while it is uncertain that the artists envisioned anything like it. Fluid animation needs a proper breakdown of a motion into the separate images of very short instances, which could hardly be imagined before modern times. The notion of fractions of a second was underdeveloped until the nineteenth century, when photography and more precise measuring instruments were introduced, and philosophers started to replace the "mechanical" concepts of the Scientific Revolution with theories about "microtime". Animation historian Giannalberto Bendazzi argued that most of the productions from before the 19th century that may look like animation are anecdotal; they lack "a cause-and-effect connection to what we now call animation" and are "thus useless to our historical discourse."

Artistic display of motion could be easily accomplished in theatrical disciplines, including puppetry. Mechanically animated figures, known as automata, have been created at least since antiquity.

Early examples of attempts to capture the phenomenon of motion into a still drawing can be recognised in Paleolithic cave paintings, for instance in the Cave of Altamira, where animals are sometimes depicted with multiple legs in superimposed positions. However, the often uncritically cited and depicted eight legs of a boar were parts of two layers painted in different periods. It has been claimed that such superimposed figures were intended to be animated with the flickering light of a fire or of a passing torch, alternately illuminating different parts of the painted rock wall and thus revealing different parts of the motion. Changing one's viewing position can also cause an animated effect in the legs, necks and heads of many examples, due to specific anamorphic distortions that mimick squash and stretch principles observed in real moving animals.

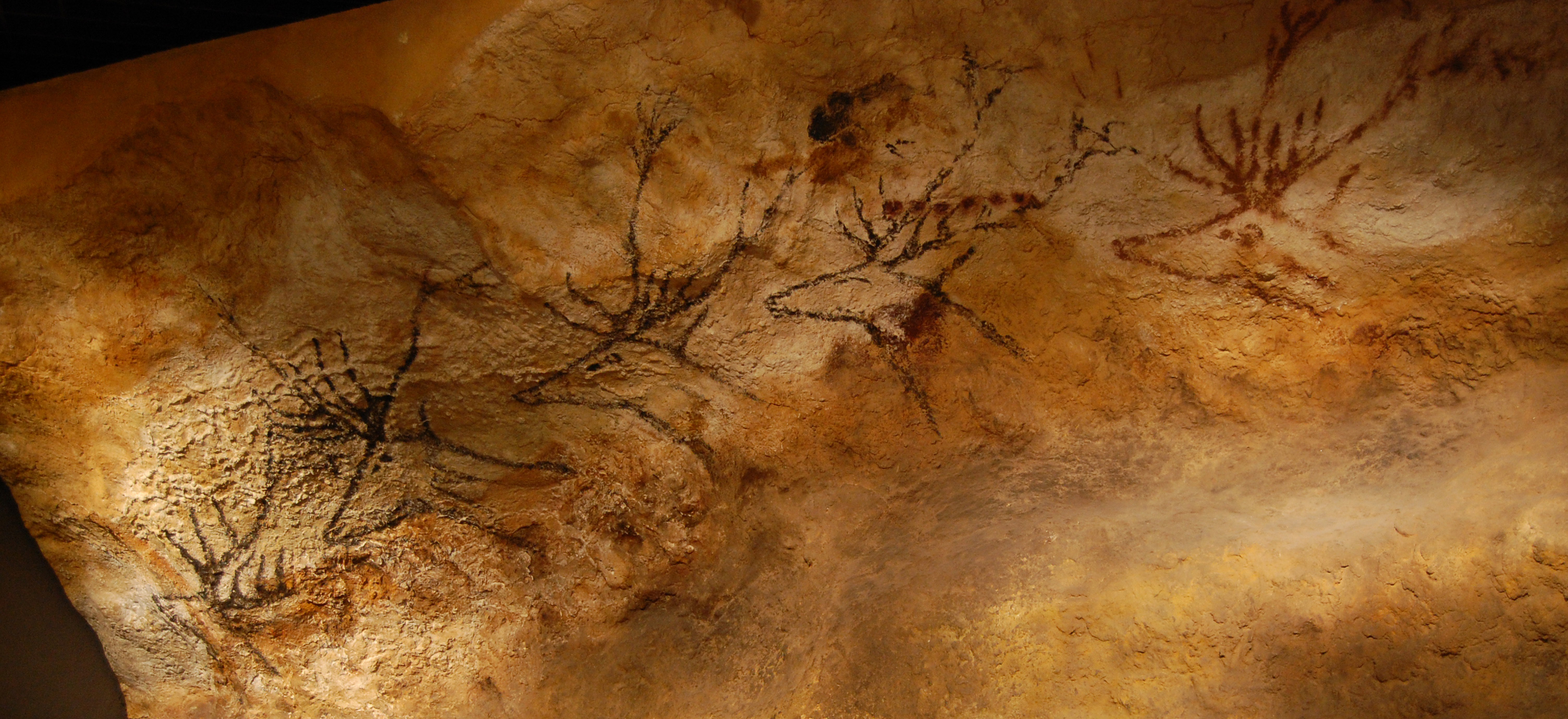
Copy of a series of prehistoric paintings from the Lascaux cave, Musée d'Aquitaine

Five paintings of the head of a deer in the cave of Lascaux have been interpreted as the depiction of one moving animal in different positions.

Archaeological finds of small paleolithic discs with a hole in the middle and drawings on both sides have been claimed to be a kind of prehistoric thaumatropes that show motion when spun on a string.

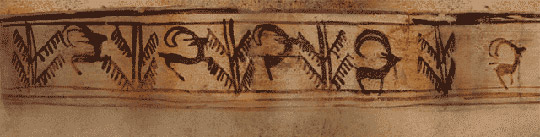
A roll-out view of the five images on the circumference of a goblet found at Shahr-e Sukhteh, estimated to be 4000 to 4500 years old

A pottery bowl dated to 2500 to 2000 BCE and discovered at the archaeological site of Shahr-e Sukhteh in Iran (associated with the Helmand culture), has five images painted around it that have been interpreted as consecutive phases of a goat leaping up to nip at a tree.

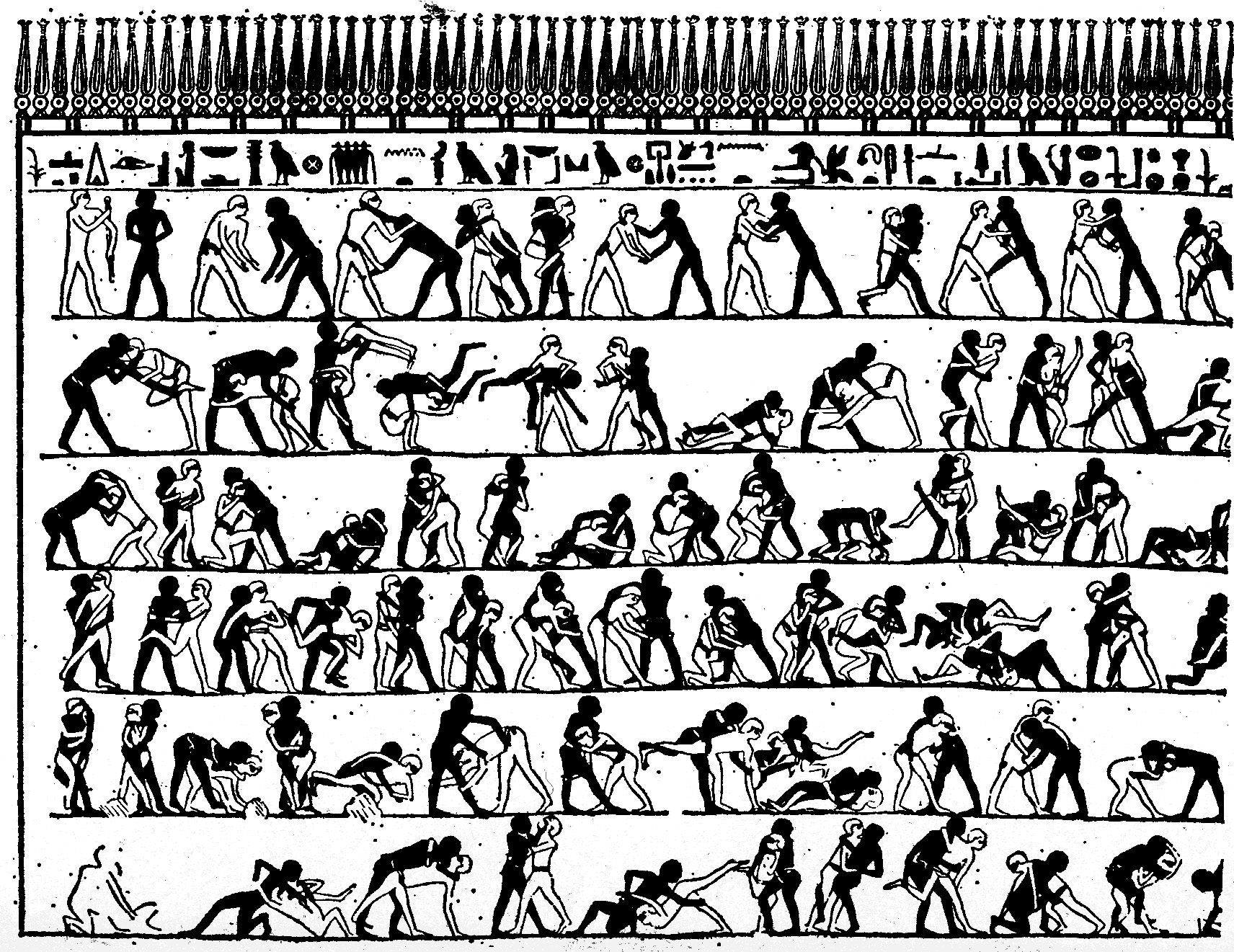
Drawing of an Egyptian burial chamber mural, approximately 4000 years old, showing wrestlers in action.

An Egyptian mural approximately 4000 years old, found in the tomb of Khnumhotep at the Beni Hassan cemetery, features a very long series of images that apparently depict the sequence of events in a wrestling match.

The Parthenon Frieze (circa 400 BCE) has been described as displaying analysis of motion and representing phases of movement, structured rhythmic and melodically with counterpoints like a symphony. It has been claimed that parts actually form a coherent animation if the figures are shot frame by frame. Although the structure follows a unique time-space continuum, it has narrative strategies.

The Roman poet and philosopher Lucretius (c. 99 BCE – c. 55 BCE) wrote in his poem De rerum natura a few lines that come close to the basic principles of animation: "...when the first image perishes and a second is then produced in another position, the former seems to have altered its pose. Of course, this must be supposed to take place very swiftly: so great is their velocity, so great the store of particles in any single moment of sensation, to enable the supply to come up." This was in the context of dream images, rather than images produced by an actual or imagined technology.

The medieval codex Sigenot (circa 1470) has sequential illuminations with relatively short intervals between different phases of action. Each page has a picture inside a frame above the text, with great consistency in size and position throughout the book (with a consistent difference in size for the recto and verso sides of each page).

A page of drawings by Leonardo da Vinci (1452–1519) show anatomical studies with four different angles of the muscles of shoulder, arm and neck of a man. The four drawings can be read as a rotating movement.

Ancient Chinese records contain several mentions of devices, including one made by the inventor Ding Huan, said to "give an impression of movement" to a series of human or animal figures on them, but these accounts are unclear and may only refer to the actual movement of the figures through space.

Since before 1000 CE, the Chinese had a revolving lantern that had silhouettes projected on its thin paper sides that appeared to chase each other. This was called the "trotting horse lamp" [走馬燈] as it would typically depict horses and horse-riders. The cut-out silhouettes were attached inside the lantern to a shaft with a paper vane impeller on top, rotated by heated air rising from a lamp. Some versions added extra motion with jointed heads, feet or hands of figures triggered by a transversely connected iron wire.

Volvelles have moving parts, but these and other paper materials that can be manipulated into motion are usually not regarded as animation.

== Shadow play ==
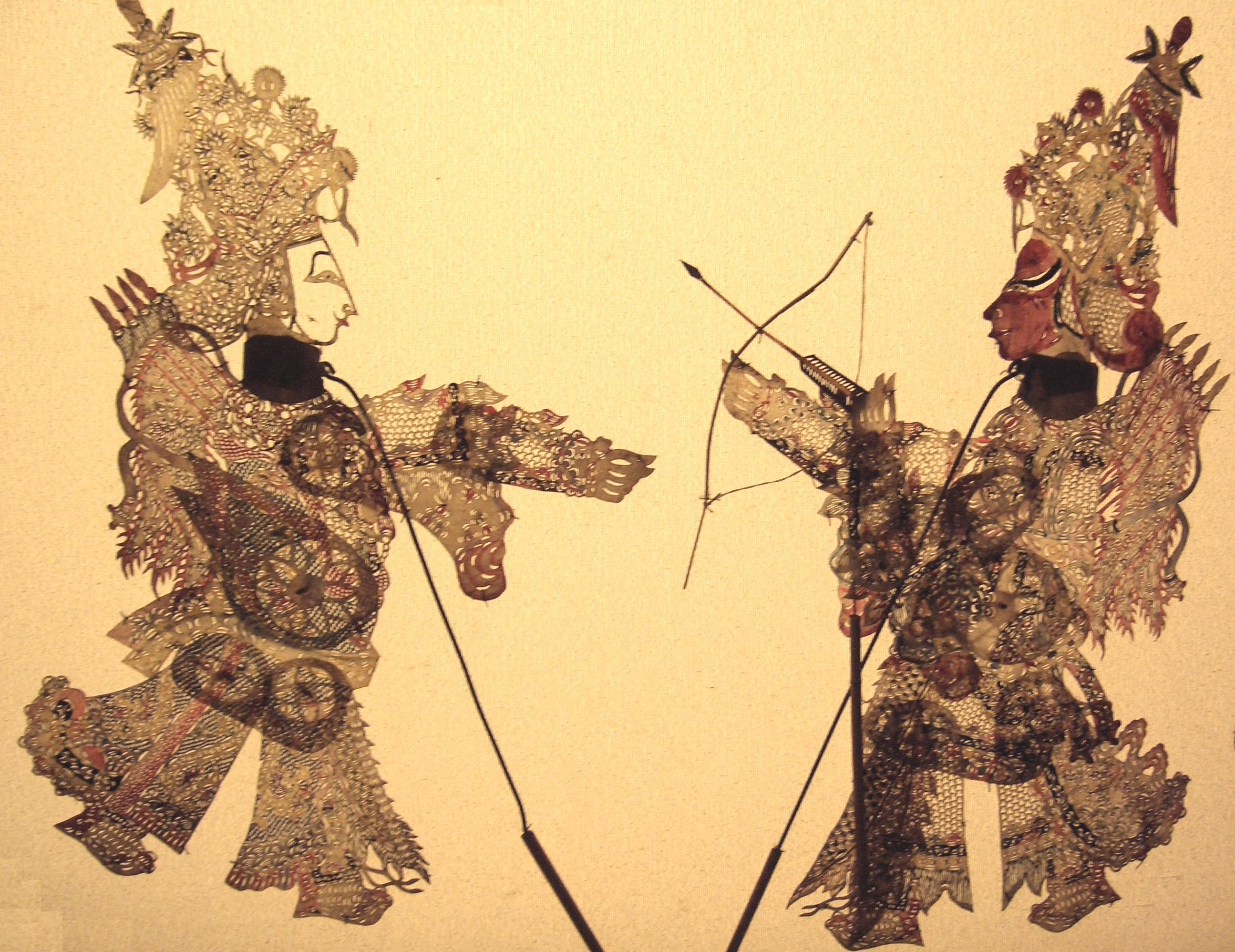
Shadow play figures, circa 1780.

Shadow play has much in common with animation: people watching moving figures on a screen as a popular form of entertainment, usually a story with dialogue, sounds and music. The figures could be very detailed and very articulated.

The earliest projection of images was most likely done in primitive shadowgraphy dating back to prehistory. It evolved into more refined forms of shadow puppetry, mostly with flat jointed cut-out figures which are held between a source of light and a translucent screen. The shapes of the puppets sometimes include translucent color or other types of detailing. The history of shadow puppetry is uncertain, but seems to have originated in Asia, possibly in the 1st millennium BCE. Clearer records seem to go back to around 900 CE. It later spread to the Ottoman Empire and seems not to have reached Europe before the 17th century. It became popular in France at the end of the 18th century. François Dominique Séraphin started his elaborate shadow shows in 1771 and performed them until his death in 1800. His heirs continued until their theatre closed in 1870. Séraphin sometimes used clockwork mechanisms to automate the show.

Around the time cinematography was developed, several theaters in Montmartre showed elaborate, successful "Ombres Chinoises" shows. The famous Le Chat Noir produced 45 different shows between 1885 and 1896.

== The Magic Lantern ==
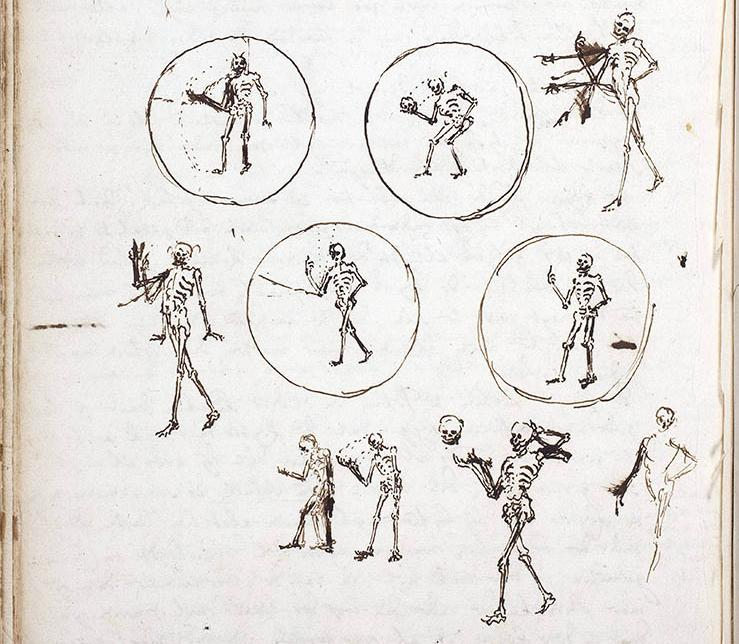
Christiaan Huygens' 1659 sketches for a projection of Death taking off his head

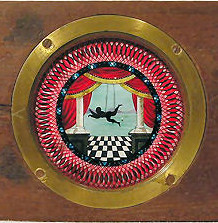
Slide with a fantoccini trapeze artist and a chromatrope border design (circa 1880)

Moving images were possibly projected with the magic lantern since its invention by Christiaan Huygens in 1659. His sketches for magic lantern slides have been dated to that year and are the oldest known document concerning the magic lantern. One encircled sketch depicts Death raising his arm from his toes to his head, another shows him moving his right arm up and down from his elbow and yet another taking his skull off his neck and placing it back. Dotted lines indicate the intended movements.

Techniques to add motion to painted glass slides for the magic lantern were described since circa 1700. These usually involved parts (for instance, limbs) painted on one or more extra pieces of glass moved by hand or small mechanisms across a stationary slide which showed the rest of the picture. Popular subjects for mechanical slides included the sails of a windmill turning, a procession of figures, a drinking man lowering and raising his glass to his mouth, a head with moving eyes, a nose growing very long, rats jumping in the mouth of a sleeping man. A more complex 19th century rackwork slide showed the then known eight planets and their satellites orbiting around the sun. Two layers of painted waves on glass could create a convincing illusion of a calm sea turning into a stormy sea tossing some boats about by increasing the speed of the manipulation of the different parts.

In 1770 Edmé-Gilles Guyot detailed how to project a magic lantern image on smoke to create a transparent, shimmering image of a hovering ghost. This technique was used in the phantasmagoria shows that became popular in several parts of Europe between 1790 and the 1830s. Other techniques were developed to produce convincing ghost experiences. The lantern was handheld to move the projection across the screen (which was usually an almost invisible transparent screen behind which the lanternist operated hidden in the dark). A ghost could seem to approach the audience or grow larger by moving the lantern away from the screen, sometimes with the lantern on a trolley on rails. Multiple lanterns made ghosts move independently and were occasionally used for superimposition in the composition of complicated scenes.

Dissolving views became a popular magic lantern show, especially in England in the 1830s and 1840s. These typically had a landscape changing from a winter version to a spring or summer variation by slowly diminishing the light from one version while introducing the aligned projection of the other slide. Another use showed the gradual change of, for instance, groves into cathedrals.

Between the 1840s and 1870s several abstract magic lantern effects were developed. This included the chromatrope which projected dazzling colorful geometrical patterns by rotating two painted glass discs in opposite directions.

Occasionally small shadow puppets had been used in phantasmagoria shows. Magic lantern slides with jointed figures set in motion by levers, thin rods, or cams and worm wheels were also produced commercially and patented in 1891. A popular version of these "Fantoccini slides" had a somersaulting monkey with arms attached to a mechanism that made it tumble with dangling feet. Fantoccini slides are named after the Italian word for puppets like marionettes or jumping jacks.

== 19th century devices ==
Numerous devices that successfully displayed animated images were introduced well before the 1888 advent of celluloid film and the motion picture. These devices were used to entertain, amaze, and sometimes even frighten people. The majority of these devices didn't project their images, and could only be viewed by one or a few persons at a time. They were largely considered optical toys at the time. Many of these devices are still built by and for film students learning the basic principles of animation.

=== Prelude ===
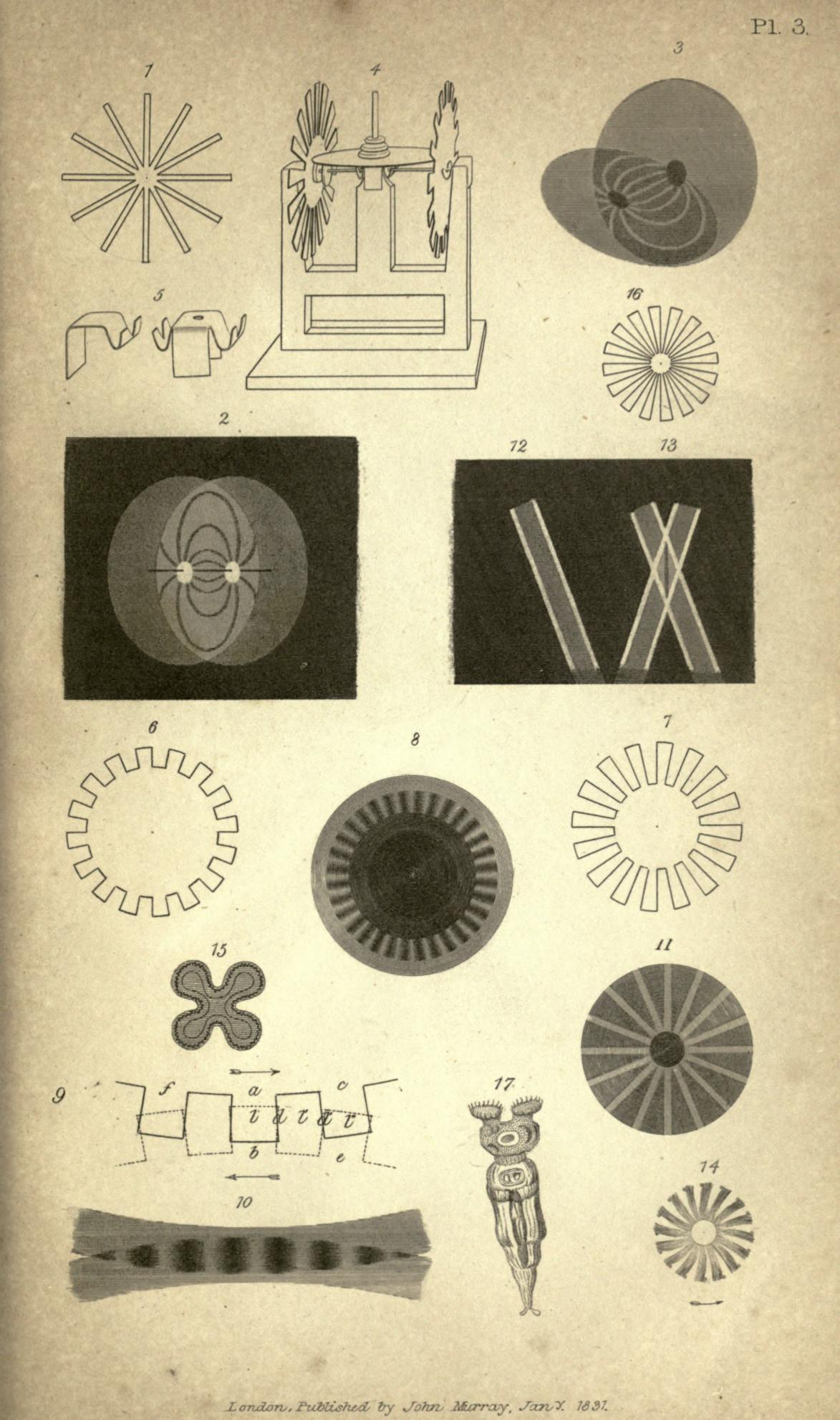
Illustrations of Michael Faraday's experiments with rotating wheels with cogs or spokes (1831)

An article in the Quarterly Journal of Science, Literature, and The Arts (1821) raised interest in optical illusions of curved spokes in rotating wheels seen through vertical apertures. In 1824, Peter Mark Roget provided mathematical details about the appearing curvatures and added the observation that the spokes appeared motionless. Roget claimed that the illusion is due to the fact "that an impression made by a pencil of rays on the retina, if sufficiently vivid, will remain for a certain time after the cause has ceased." This was later seen as the basis for the theory of "persistence of vision" as the principle of how we see film as motion rather than the successive stream of still images actually presented to the eye. This theory has been discarded as the (sole) principle of the effect since 1912, but remains in many film history explanations. However, Roget's experiments and explanation did inspire further research by Michael Faraday and by Joseph Plateau that eventually brought about the invention of animation.

=== Thaumatrope (1825) ===
In April 1825 the first thaumatrope was published by W. Phillips (in anonymous association with John Ayrton Paris) and became a popular toy. The pictures on either side of a small cardboard disc seem to blend into one combined image when it is twirled quickly by the attached strings. This is often used as an illustration of what has often been called "persistence of vision", presumably referring to the effect in which the impression of a single image persists although in reality two different images are presented with interruptions. It is unclear how much of the effect relates to positive afterimages. Although a thaumatrope can also be used for two-phase animation, no examples are known to have been produced with this effect until long after the phénakisticope had established the principle of animation.

=== Phénakistiscope (1833) ===
Prof. Stampfers Stroboscopische Scheibe No. X (1833)

The phénakisticope (better known by the misspelling phenakistiscope or phenakistoscope) was the first animation device using rapid successive substitution of sequential pictures. The pictures are evenly spaced radially around a disc, with small rectangular apertures at the rim of the disc. The animation could be viewed through the slits of the spinning disc in front of a mirror. It was invented in November or December 1832 by the Belgian Joseph Plateau and almost simultaneously by the Austrian Simon von Stampfer. Plateau first published about his invention in January 1833. The publication included an illustration plate of a fantascope with 16 frames depicting a pirouetting dancer. The phénakisticope was successful as a novelty toy and within a year many sets of stroboscopic discs were published across Europe, with almost as many different names for the device - including Fantascope (Plateau), The Stroboscope (Stampfer) and Phénakisticope (Parisian publisher Giroux & Cie). Plateau also proposed that 16 plaster models could be used for the purpose of animation, an early example of stop motion. Unfortunately, the plan was never executed, possibly because Plateau was almost completely blind by this time.

The earliest known public screening of projected stroboscopic animation was presented by Austrian magician Ludwig Döbler on 15 January 1847 at the Josephstadt Theatre in Vienna, with his patented Phantaskop. The spectacle was well-received with sold-out shows in several European cities during a tour that lasted until the spring of 1848, although one critic complained about the flickering quality of the stroboscopic images.

=== Zoetrope (1833/1866) ===
In July 1833, Simon Stampfer described the possibility of using the stroboscope principle in a cylinder (as well as on looped strips) in a pamphlet accompanying the second edition of his version of the phénakisticope. British mathematician William George Horner suggested a cylindrical variation of Plateau's phénakisticope in January 1834. Horner planned to publish this Dædaleum with optician King, Jr in Bristol but it "met with some impediment probably in the sketching of the figures".

In 1865, William Ensign Lincoln invented the definitive zoetrope with easily replaceable strips of images. It also had an illustrated paper disc on the base, which was not always exploited on the commercially produced versions. Lincoln licensed his invention to Milton Bradley and Co. who first advertised it on December 15, 1866.

In 1887, Étienne-Jules Marey created a large zoetrope with a series of plaster models based on his chronophotographs of birds in flight.

=== Flip book (kineograph) (1868) ===
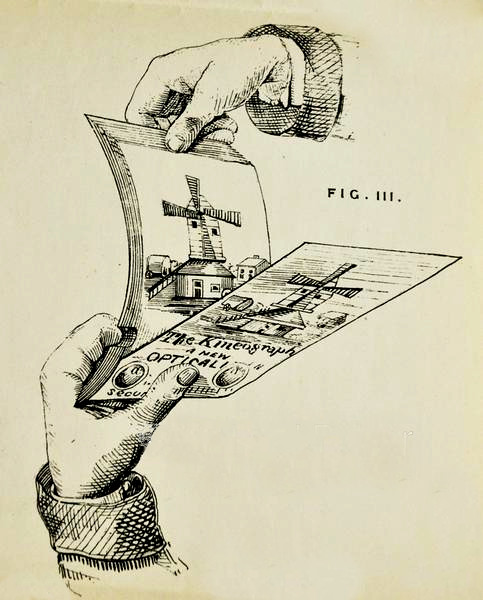
illustration of the Kineograph in Linnett's 1868 patent

John Barnes Linnett patented the first flip book in 1868 as the kineograph. A flip book is a small book with relatively springy pages, each having one in a series of animation images located near its unbound edge. The user bends all of the pages back, normally with the thumb, then by a gradual motion of the hand allows them to spring free one at a time. As with the phenakistoscope, zoetrope and praxinoscope, the illusion of motion is created by the apparent sudden replacement of each image by the next in the series, but unlike those other inventions, no view-interrupting shutter or assembly of mirrors is required and no viewing device other than the user's hand is absolutely necessary. Early film animators cited flip books as their inspiration more often than the earlier devices, which did not reach as wide an audience.

The older devices by their nature severely limit the number of images that can be included in a sequence without making the device very large or the images impractically small. The book format still imposes a physical limit, but many dozens of images of ample size can easily be accommodated. Inventors stretched even that limit with the mutoscope, patented in 1894 and sometimes still found in amusement arcades. It consists of a large circularly-bound flip book in a housing, with a viewing lens and a crank handle that drives a mechanism that slowly rotates the assembly of images past a catch, sized to match the running time of an entire reel of film.

Le singe musicien (1878) praxinoscope animation

=== Praxinoscope (1877) ===
French inventor Charles-Émile Reynaud developed the praxinoscope in 1876 and patented it in 1877. It is similar to the zoetrope but instead of the slits in the cylinder it has twelve rectangular mirrors placed evenly around the center of the cylinder. Each mirror reflects another image of the picture strip placed opposite on the inner wall of the cylinder. When rotating the praxinoscope shows the sequential images one by one, resulting in fluid animation. The praxinoscope allowed a much clearer view of the moving image compared to the zoetrope, since the zoetrope's images were actually mostly obscured by the spaces in between its slits. In 1879, Reynaud registered a modification to the praxinoscope patent to include the Praxinoscope Théâtre, which utilized the Pepper's ghost effect to present the animated figures in an exchangeable background. Later improvements included the "Praxinoscope à projection" (marketed since 1882) which used a double magic lantern to project the animated figures over a still projection of a background.

=== Zoopraxiscope (1879) ===
Eadweard Muybridge had circa 70 of his famous chronophotographic sequences painted on glass discs for the zoopraxiscope projector that he used in his popular lectures between 1880 and 1895. In the 1880s the images were painted onto the glass in dark contours. Later discs made between 1892 and 1894 had outlines drawn by Erwin F. Faber that were photographically printed on the disc and then coloured by hand, but these were probably never used in the lectures. The painted figures were largely transposed from the photographs, but many fanciful combinations were made and sometimes imaginary elements were added.

== After 1888 ==
The development of flexible waxed paper or celluloid photographic film around 1885 turned out to be a very welcome medium for experimenters who hoped to create motion pictures. Le Prince was possibly the first to record motion on such rolls of film around 1888, followed by William K. L. Dickson/Edison's Kinetoscope (eventually introduced in 1893) and Lumière's Cinematograph. Since the photographic detail and the realism of the images were among the best appreciated features of motion pictures, animation did not immediately find its place on the silver screen. When it eventually did, it soon gained enormous successes and was there to stay.
