= Back from the Klondike =

Puzzle

A modern rendering of the puzzle, with the reported mistake corrected ("81212" becoming "81112" in the 16th row).

Back from the Klondike is a maze first printed in the New York Journal and Advertiser on April 24, 1898. In introducing the puzzle, creator Sam Loyd describes it as having been constructed to specifically foil Leonhard Euler's rule for solving any maze puzzle by working backwards from the end point.

The following are Sam Loyd's original instructions:

Start from the heart in the center. Go three steps in a straight line in any one of the eight directions, north, south, east, west, northeast, northwest, southeast, or southwest. When you have gone three steps in a straight line you will reach a square with a number on it, which indicates the second day's journey, as many steps as it tells, in a straight line in any one of the eight directions. From this new point, march on again according to the number indicated, and continue on in this manner until you come upon a square with a number which will carry you just one step beyond the border, thus solving the puzzle.

== Solution ==
Loyd's given solution to the puzzle, described by Martin Gardner as "sneaky", is to move southwest twice, northeast three times, southwest three times and end with what Loyd calls a "bold strike via S.E. to liberty!".

In 1976, two graduate students at the University of Washington wrote a Fortran program to solve the puzzle, and discovered hundreds of possible solutions, all of them eventually converging on a square which was part of Loyd's given solution. All of these routes also passed through a particular square which was not part of Loyd's solution, suggesting an artist's error in drawing the original puzzle. Changing this square from a "2" to a "1" results in a puzzle which only has a single solution.
