= The Sam Loyd Company =

American puzzle game producer

- Company type: Private
- Industry: Puzzles
- Founded: 2002; 24 years ago
- Headquarters: United States
- Area served: Worldwide
- Key people: Samuel Loyd
- Website: www.samloyd.com

The Sam Loyd Company is an American puzzle games company. The company was launched in 2002 after the work of Samuel Loyd and his son in the 1800s and 1900s.

Sam Loyd produced puzzles for a number of resources including the New York Saturday Courier, Brooklyn Daily Eagle, Women's Home Companion and created puzzle cards for advertising purposes. It was 2002 before the company was founded to republish and protect Loyd's original work.

== Origin ==
Between the years of 1855 and 1910, Sam Loyd produced a number of puzzles and chess problems for a variety of newspapers and magazines. These included the New York Courier and Our Puzzle Magazine. The White Horse Monument was his most successful puzzle, which was based on the White Horse Monument in Berkshire, UK.

Other puzzles created by Sam Loyd still used today include, ‘Trick Donkey’s Puzzle’, ‘Get Off the Earth’ and ‘Puzzle of Teddy and the Lion’. The puzzles he created went on to be known as some of the best of all time. After his death in 1911, his son Walter L Loyd, also known as Sam Loyd Jnr, continued his work.

Walter L Loyd began by creating a puzzle book for children, something the company would later focus on. He also created the book ‘Sam Loyd’s Cyclopedia of 500 Puzzles, Tricks and Conundrums. All the work created by Sam Loyd and his son is managed and protected by the Sam Loyd Company.

71 years after the passing of Sam Loyd Jnr. work began on republishing the original ‘Get Off the Earth’ Puzzle. A website containing the puzzle was also launched. In 2004, “Get Off the Earth Puzzle' is republished as a commemorative edition, 110 years after Sam Loyd had received his original patent for the puzzle.

In 2005, the Sam Loyd Company was founded. In the same year both Trick Donkey’s and The Pony Puzzles were republished.

== Products ==
The Sam Loyd Company recreated a number of puzzles including figurines, republished puzzles and advertising cards. The only figurine they have produced was of the Warrior action figure, taken from the ‘Get Off the Earth’ puzzle. This figurine was a limited edition and only 500 were produced.

The company also owns the rights to a number of silent movies that were created in 1917 after the success of the puzzles. These videos have close links with Thomas Edison, who helped bring the work to life. The idea was to create educational films that could be shown in classrooms. The videos included the railroad mix up, quarrelsome neighbors and the puzzling board.

== Education ==
The Sam Loyd Company has close links to education. The puzzles are aimed at making algebraic and geographical problems more interesting. The idea is that people can puzzle over them without realizing they are learning at the same time. The influences came from Samuel Loyd who was quoted saying, “We see how the average boy, who abhors square root or algebra, will find delight in working out puzzles which involve identically the same principles."
