= Missing dollar riddle =

Riddle involving informal fallacy in money

The missing dollar riddle is a famous riddle that involves an informal fallacy, in which hotel guests split their bill in a complicated manner which appears to leave a single dollar unaccounted for. It dates back to at least the 1930s, although similar puzzles are much older.

== Statement ==
Although the wording and specifics can vary, the puzzle runs along these lines:

Three guests check into a hotel room. The manager says the bill is $30, so each guest pays $10. Later the manager realizes the bill should only have been $25. To rectify this, he gives the bellhop $5 as five one-dollar bills to return to the guests.

On the way to the guests' room to refund the money, the bellhop realizes that he cannot equally divide the five one-dollar bills among the three guests. As the guests are not aware of the total of the revised bill, the bellhop decides to just give each guest $1 back and keep $2 as a tip for himself, and proceeds to do so.

As each guest got $1 back, each guest only paid $9, bringing the total paid to $27. The bellhop kept $2, which when added to the $27, comes to $29. So if the guests originally handed over $30, what happened to the remaining $1?

There seems to be a discrepancy, as there cannot be two answers ($29 and $30) to the math problem. On the one hand it is true that the $25 in the register, the $3 returned to the guests, and the $2 kept by the bellhop add up to $30, but on the other hand, the $27 paid by the guests and the $2 kept by the bellhop add up to only $29.

== Solution ==
The misdirection in this riddle is in the second half of the description, where unrelated amounts are added together and the person to whom the riddle is posed assumes those amounts should add up to 30, and is then surprised when they do not — there is, in fact, no reason why the (10 − 1) × 3 + 2 = 29 sum should add up to 30.

The exact sum mentioned in the riddle is computed as:

SUM =	$9 (payment by Guest 1) +
	$9 (payment by Guest 2) +
	$9 (payment by Guest 3) +
	$2 (money in bellhop's pocket)

Flow of dollars in the riddle – comparing the sum of values circled in yellow (10+10+10=30) with the sum of absolute values of those shaded yellow (9+9+9+2=29) is meaningless

The trick here is to realize that this is not a sum of the money that the three people paid originally, as that would need to include the money the clerk has ($25). This is instead a sum of a smaller amount the people could have paid ($9 × 3 people = $27), added with the additional money that the clerk would not have needed had they paid that smaller amount ($27 paid - $25 actual cost = $2). Another way to say this is, the $27 already includes the bellhop's tip. To add the $2 to the $27 would be to double-count it. So, the three guests' cost of the room, including the bellhop's tip, is $27. Each of the 3 guests has $1 in his pocket, totaling $3. When added to the $27 revised cost of the room (including tip to the bellhop), the total is $30.

To obtain a sum that totals to the original $30, every dollar must be accounted for, regardless of its location.

Thus, the sensible sum can be expressed in this manner:

$30 =	$1	(in Guest 1's pocket)	+
	$1	(in Guest 2's pocket)	+
	$1	(in Guest 3's pocket)	+
	$2	(in bellhop's pocket)	+
	$25	(in hotel cash register)

This sum does indeed come out to $30.

To put it another way, it's as if each guest spent $9, while the bellhop spent negative $2 (as in, he received $2, rather than spending it), totalling the $25 spent.

=== Illustration with large discount ===
To further illustrate why the riddle's sum does not relate to the actual sum, the riddle can be altered so that the discount on the room is extremely large. Consider the riddle in this form:

Three people check into a hotel room. The clerk says the bill is $30, so each guest pays $10. Later the clerk realizes the bill should only be $10. To rectify this, he gives the bellhop $20 to return to the guests. On the way to the room, the bellhop realizes that he cannot divide the money equally. As the guests didn't know the total of the revised bill, the bellhop decides to just give each guest $6 and keep $2 as a tip for himself. Each guest got $6 back: so now each guest only paid $4; bringing the total paid to $12. The bellhop has $2. And $12 + $2 = $14 so, if the guests originally handed over $30, what happened to the remaining $16?

Now it is more obvious that the question is quite unreasonable. One cannot simply add a couple of payments together and expect them to total an original amount of circulated cash.

=== Economic approach ===
More economically, money is accounted by summing together all paid amounts (liabilities) with all money in one's possession (assets). That abstract formula holds regardless of the relative perspectives of the actors in this exchange.

- The guests of the hotel paid $27, but also have $3 among their pockets at the story's end. Their assets are $3, and their liabilities are $27 ($30 = 27 + 3). Thus, the original total is accounted for.
- From the perspective of the hotel clerk, the hotel has $25 in assets and lost $5 in liabilities ($30 = 25 + 5).
- From the perspective of the bellhop, his assets are $2, and his liabilities are $3 to guests and $25 to the register at the desk ($30 = 2 + 3 + 25).

=== Step-by-step equations ===
To illustrate the issue through equations:

- 10 + 10 + 10 = 30
- 10 + 10 + 10 = 25 + 2 + 3
- 10 + 10 + 10 - 3 = 25 + 2 + 3 - 3 (adding -3 to both sides of the equation to cancel out the +3 on the right side)
- 10 - 1 + 10 - 1 + 10 - 1 = 25 + 2
- 9 + 9 + 9 = 25 + 2 (obs: tip to bellhop has already been paid)
- 27 = 27

The riddle is deceptive in then proceeding through the following four steps:

- 9 + 9 + 9 = 25 + 2
- 9 + 9 + 9 + 2 ≠ 25 (pushing +2 to the other side without inverting the sign)
- 27 + 2 ≠ 25
- 29 ≠ 25

Instead, it should proceed as follows:

- 9 + 9 + 9 = 25 + 2
- 9 + 9 + 9 -2 = 25 + 2 -2 (adding -2 to both sides of the equation to cancel the +2 on the right side, which means the bellhop returned the tip or gave a discount of $2)
- 9 + 9 + 9 - 2 = 25
- 27 - 2 = 25
- 25 = 25

The puzzle should subtract the bellhop's tip from the $27 rather than add it.

=== Using algebra ===
Let n guests initially pay p dollars each. The manager refunds r, to which the bellhop gives back b to each guest.

Each guest ends up with a balance of b − p (a negative amount), the manager with np − r and the bellhop r − nb. Whereas the guests' total initial payment is np, the sum of their eventual expense and the bellhop's pilferage is n(p − b) + (r − nb) = np + r − 2nb.

The discrepancy noted is thus np − (np + r − 2nb) = 2nb − r. With the riddle's values, 2 × 3 × $1 − $5 = $1.

Other values such as r = $20 and b = $6 give an unremarkable discrepancy of 2 × 3 × $6 − $20 = $16. Alternatively, values where b = r/2n yield no discrepancy.

== History ==
There are many variants of the puzzle. Professor David Singmaster's Chronology of Recreational Mathematics suggests these types of mathematical misdirection puzzles descended from a problem in an 18th-century arithmetic book, Francis Walkingame's Tutor's Assistant which was published, and republished, from 1751 to 1860 where it appeared on page 185, prob. 116 in this form, "If 48 taken from 120 leaves 72, and 72 taken from 91 leaves 19, and 7 taken from thence leaves 12, what number is that, out of which, when you have taken 48, 72, 19, and 7, leaves 12?" Singmaster adds, "Though this is not the same as the withdrawal problems below, the mixing of amounts subtracted and remainders makes me think that this kind of problem may have been the basis of the later kind."

An 1880 misdirection is given as "Barthel sees two boxes at a jeweller's, priced at 100 and 200. He buys the cheaper one and takes it home, where he decides he really prefers the other. He returns to the jeweller and gives him the box back and says that the jeweller already has 100 from him, which together with the returned box, makes 200, which is the cost of the other box. The jeweller accepts this and gives Barthel the other box and Barthel goes on his way. Is this correct?"

A model more similar in style to the modern version was given by Cecil B. Read in his 1933 Mathematical Fallacies. His puzzle produces an extra dollar: A man puts $50 in the bank. Then on subsequent days he withdraws $20 leaving $30; then $15 leaving $15; then $9 leaving $6, and finally $6 leaving $0. But $30 + $15 + $6 = $51. Where did the extra dollar come from?

The actual solution to this riddle is to add correctly (correct time, correct person and correct location) from the bank point of view which in this case seems to be the problem:

1. First day: $30 in the bank + $20 owner already withdrew = $50
2. Second day: $15 in the bank + ($15 + $20 owner already withdrew) = $50
3. Third day: $6 in the bank + ($9 + $15 + $20 owner already withdrew) = $50

From the owner point of view the correct solution is this:

1. First day: $20 owner already withdrew + $30 in the bank = $50
2. Second day: $20 owner already withdrew + $15 owner already withdrew + $15 in the bank = $50
3. Third day: ($20 owner already withdrew + $15 owner already withdrew + $9 owner already withdrew) + $6 in the bank = $50

The solution appears very obvious if the owner withdraws every day only $10 from $50. To add up 40 + 30 + 20 + 10 using the same pattern from above would be too obviously wrong (the result would be $100).

The answer to the question, "Where did the extra dollar come from?" can be found from consecutively adding the bank rest from three different days. This way is correct only if the money owner withdraws every day exact half of the money. Then it will add up. ($25 + $12.50 + $6.25) + $6.25 = $50

Another entry from 1933, R. M. Abraham's Diversions and Pastimes (still available in a Dover version) poses a slightly different approach with this problem from page 16 (problem 61). "A traveller returning to New York found that he had only a ten-dollar postal money order, and that his train fare was seven dollars. The ticket clerk refused to accept the money order, so the traveller went across the road to a pawn shop and pawned it for seven dollars. On his way back to the station he met a friend, who, to save the traveller the trouble of returning to redeem the money order, bought the pawn ticket from him for seven dollars. The traveller then bought his ticket and still had seven dollars when he got to New York. Who made the loss?" David Darling in his The Universal book of Mathematics, credits this as an earlier version of the three men in a hotel version above.

Even more similar is the English, The Black-Out Book by Evelyn August in 1939; What happened to the shilling?, pp. 82 & 213. Three girls each pay five shillings to share a room. The landlord refunds 5 shillings via the bellboy, who gives them each one and keeps two.

And one more from the same theme appears in an Abbott and Costello routine in which Abbott asks Costello for a fifty-dollar loan. Costello holds out forty dollars and says, "That's all I have." Abbott responds, "Fine, you can owe me the other ten."

The riddle is used by psychotherapist (Chris Langham) with his mathematician client (Paul Whitehouse) in episode 5 of the 2005 BBC comedy series Help.

A variation, also involving shillings and three men in a restaurant who are overcharged, appears in the third volume of Jennifer Worth's Call the Midwife books, Farewell to the East End (2009). There, repairman Fred poses it to the midwives of Nonnatus House.

Another variation, replacing the guests with shepherds, the clerk with a troll, the dollars with sheep and the bellboy with the troll's son, appears in Dr. No by Percival Everett.

== See also ==
- Missing square puzzle
