= Puzzle lock =

Lock with unusual or hidden mechanics

A puzzle lock or puzzle padlock is a type of mechanical puzzle. It consists of a lock with unusual or hidden mechanics. Puzzle locks are reconfigurable mechanisms where the topological structure changes during the operation. Such locks are sometimes called trick locks, because there is a trick to opening them which needs to be found. Puzzle locks exist both with keys and without keys.

== China ==
Puzzle locks with exposed keyholes were widely used in ancient China and can be very tricky to open.

There are three main types in China:

- Locks with extra obstacle
- Locks with indirect insertion
- Multi-stage locks.

== Europe ==
In Europe, many small puzzle padlocks had front plate with a face or mask. The padlocks were designed to secure small bags or pouches and could be found across Europe with the most around the Danubian provinces and Aquileia. They were often shaped like rings and may have been fitted around the mouth of a bag as a sort of tamper-proof seal. The earliest Roman puzzle locks date back to the 2nd century BCE.

In the 1850s in the UK, "puzzle lock" was synonymous with "letter lock" and used to denote a lettered combination lock.

== See also ==
- Puzzle box
