= Excelsior (chess problem) =

Chess problem

Sam Loyd, London Era, 1861

Position: a8 black knight, c8 black rook, d8 black bishop, b7 black pawn, f7 black pawn, h7 black pawn, b6 black pawn, b5 white rook, h5 white king, a3 black pawn, e3 black pawn, g3 white pawn, h3 white knight, b2 white pawn, c2 white pawn, e2 white rook, a1 white knight, h1 black king

White to move and mate in five

"Excelsior" is one of Sam Loyd's most famous chess problems, originally published in London Era in 1861. In 1867, it participated together with five other problems as a set in an international problem tournament. The motto for the full set was "Excelsior" (eng. 'Ever upward'), generally known as the title of the poem "Excelsior" by Henry Wadsworth Longfellow, and as that term is very fitting for this particular problem, it is generally associated with it. It is not to be confused by a popular 1958 study of the same name by Russian chess composer Vladimir Korolkov, which has a similar thematic motif.

== Backstory ==
Loyd had a friend who was willing to wager that he could always find the piece which delivered the principal mate of a chess problem. Loyd composed this problem as a joke and bet his friend dinner that he could not pick a piece that didn't give mate in the main line (his friend immediately identified the pawn on b2 as being the least likely to deliver mate), and when the problem was published it was with the stipulation that White mates with "the least likely piece or pawn". Its first publication, in 1861, is not accompanied by any such stipulation.

== Solution ==
1. b4!

Threatening 2.Rf5 any (Note: Any legal move by Black.) 3.Rf1# or 2.Rd5 any 3.Rd1# (with possible prolonging of both by 2...Rc5 3.bxc5 any 4.R mates). White cannot begin with 1.Rf5 because Black's 1...Rc5 would pin the rook. Now there are multiple possible moves defending only one of the threats and one secondary non-thematical defence: 1...Rxc2 2.Nxc2! a2 3.Rd5 (or Rf5) a1=Q 4.Nxa1 any 5.R mates.

1... Rc5+ 2. bxc5!

Threatening 3.Rb1#.

2... a2 3. c6!

Again with the same threats as on move one, i.e. 4.Rf5 any 5.Rf1# or 4.Rd5 any 5.Rd1#.

3... Bc7

Because both Rd5 and Rf5 are threatened; the alternative moves 3...Bf6 and 3...Bg5 would only defend against one or the other. The given move does defend against Rd5 in the sense that 4.Rd5 Bxg3 5.Rd1+ Be1 6.Rdxe1# takes more than the required five moves, and similarly for 4.Rf5 Bf4.

4. cxb7 any 5. bxa8=Q/B#

The mate is delivered with the pawn that starts on b2.

Any problem that features a pawn moving from its starting square to promotion in the course of the solution is now said to demonstrate the Excelsior theme. Nowadays it is most usually shown in helpmates and seriesmovers.
