= Puzzle box =

Box that can be opened only by solving a puzzle

Japanese puzzle box

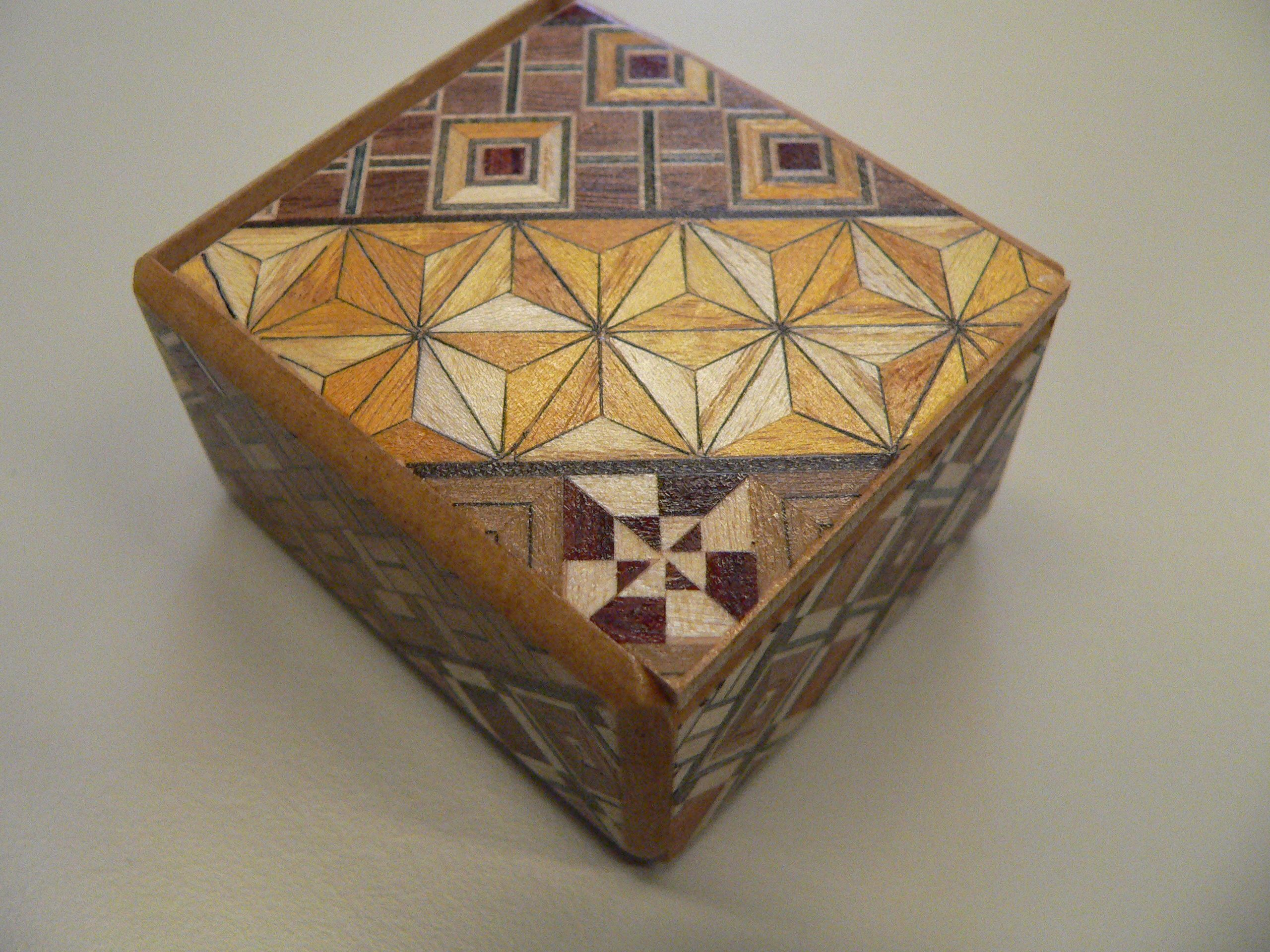
closed

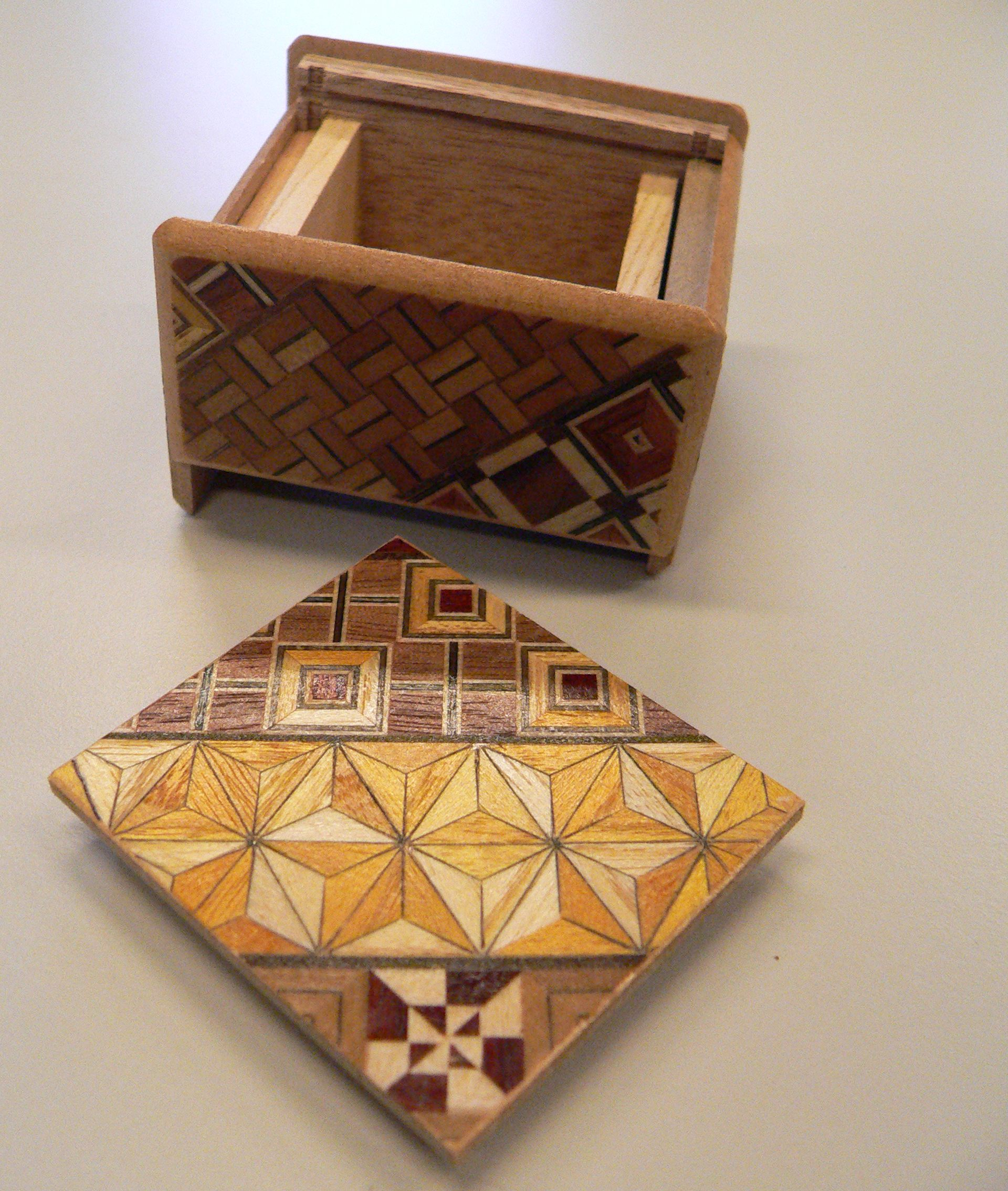
open

A puzzle box (also called a secret box or trick box) is a box that can be opened only by solving a puzzle. Some require only a simple move and others a series of discoveries.

Modern puzzle boxes developed from furniture and jewelry boxes with secret compartments and hidden openings, known since the Renaissance. Puzzle boxes produced for entertainment first appeared in Victorian England in the 19th century and as tourist souvenirs in the Interlaken region in Switzerland and in the Hakone region of Japan at the end of the 19th and the beginning of the 20th century. Boxes with secret openings appeared as souvenirs at other tourist destinations during the early 20th century, including the Amalfi Coast, Madeira, and Sri Lanka, though these were mostly 'one-trick' traditions. Chinese cricket boxes represent another example of intricate boxes with secret openings.

Interest in puzzle boxes subsided during and after the two World Wars. The art was revived in the 1980s by three pioneers of this genre: Akio Kamei in Japan, Trevor Wood in England, and Frank Chambers in Ireland. There are currently a number of artists producing puzzle boxes, including the Karakuri Group in Japan set up by Akio Kamei, US puzzle box specialists Robert Yarger and Kagen Sound, as well as a number of other designers and puzzle makers who produce puzzle boxes across the globe.

Clive Barker's horror novella The Hellbound Heart (later adapted into a film, Hellraiser, followed by numerous original sequels) centers on the fictional LeMarchand's box, a puzzle box which opens the gates to another dimension when manipulated.

== See also ==
- Mechanical puzzle
