= Nob Yoshigahara =

Japanese puzzler (1936–2004)

Nobuyuki Yoshigahara
- 芦ヶ原 伸之
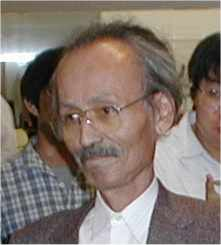
- Yoshigahara in 2000
- Born: May 27, 1936; Japan
- Died: June 19, 2004 (aged 68); Japan
- Known for: Metagrobology, puzzle collector, author

Nobuyuki Yoshigahara (芦ヶ原 伸之 Yoshigahara Nobuyuki, commonly known as "Nob"; May 27, 1936 – June 19, 2004) was a Japanese inventor, collector, solver, and communicator of puzzles.

== Education and career ==
Nob graduated from the Tokyo Institute of Technology in applied chemistry. After becoming disenchanted with his career in high-polymer engineering, Nob turned to high school teaching as an educator of chemistry and mathematics.

As a puzzle columnist, Nob was an active contributor to many journals and had monthly columns in various popular magazines, including Quark. He penned over 80 books on puzzles. Perhaps best known as a puzzle inventor, he commercially licensed his designs, such as the Rush Hour puzzle game, to companies including Binary Arts (now known as ThinkFun), Ishi Press, and Hanayama. He was also a computer programmer who used computers to help solve mathematical puzzles.

== Awards and honors ==
Nob was an active participant in the International Puzzle Party, traveling the world to attend the annual event. In 2005, the puzzle design competition of the International Puzzle Party was renamed the Nob Yoshigahara Puzzle Design Competition.

In 2003, the Association of Game & Puzzle Collectors awarded Nob with the Sam Loyd Award, given to individuals who have made a significant contribution to the world of mechanical puzzles.
