= The Universal Book of Mathematics =

2004 book by David Darling

The Universal Book of Mathematics: From Abracadabra to Zeno's Paradoxes
- Cover of the first edition
- Author: David Darling
- Language: English
- Subject: Mathematics
- Publisher: Wiley
- Publication date: August 11, 2004
- Publication place: United States
- Media type: Print (Hardcover and Paperback) and audio-CD
- Pages: 400
- ISBN: 0471270474

The Universal Book of Mathematics: From Abracadabra to Zeno's Paradoxes (2004) is a book by British author David Darling.

== Summary ==
The book is presented in a dictionary format. The book is divided into headwords, which, as the title suggests, run from Abracadabra to Zeno's paradoxes.

The book also provides diagrams and illustrations.

== Errors ==
The first edition of the book had several errors which were fixed in later editions. Several famous scientists have sent in corrections to the author of the book. These include Warren Johnson and Freeman Dyson.

== Reception ==
The book has been praised by BoingBoing and British newspaper The Independent.

Problems and Puzzles mentioned in the book have been discussed and debated several times by several major mathematicians.
