= David J. Darling =

English astronomer, freelance science writer, and musician

David Darling (born 29 July 1953 in Glossop, Derbyshire) is an English astronomer, freelance science writer, and musician. Darling has published numerous popular science works, including Life Everywhere: The Maverick Science of Astrobiology in 2001 and The Universal Book of Mathematics in 2004. He maintains the online Internet Encyclopedia of Science.

A review of Darling's book Soul Search, stated that "he develops a sort of scientific pantheism positing that, with death, we move from the narrow consciousness of our highly selective, reality-filtering brain to the wider, timeless consciousness of the unbound universe."

== Bibliography ==
- We Are Not Alone: Why We Have Already Found Extraterrestrial Life (2010). ISBN 978-1-85168-719-0 (paperback)
- Gravity's Arc: The Story of Gravity from Aristotle to Einstein and Beyond (2006). ISBN 978-0-471-71989-2 (hardcover)
- Teleportation: The Impossible Leap (2005). ISBN 978-0-471-47095-3 (hardcover)
- The Universal Book of Mathematics: From Abracadabra to Zeno's Paradoxes (2004). ISBN 978-0-471-27047-8 (hardcover)
- The Universal Book of Astronomy: From the Andromeda Galaxy to the Zone of Avoidance (2003). ISBN 978-0-471-26569-6 (hardcover)
- The Complete Book of Spaceflight: From Apollo 1 to Zero Gravity (2002). ISBN 978-0-471-05649-2 (hardcover)
- Life Everywhere: The Maverick Science of Astrobiology (2001). ISBN 978-0-465-01563-4 (hardcover)
- The Extraterrestrial Encyclopedia: An Alphabetical Reference to All Life in the Universe (2000) ISBN 978-0-8129-3248-5 (paperback)
- Zen Physics: The Science of Death, the Logic of Reincarnation (1996). ISBN 0-06-017352-1 (hardcover)
- Soul Search : A Scientist Explores the Afterlife (1995). ISBN 0-517-17819-2 (hardcover)
- Equations of Eternity: Speculations on Consciousness, Meaning, and the Mathematical Rules That Orchestrate the Cosmos (1993). ISBN 1-56282-875-4 (hardcover)
- Deep Time: The Journey of a Single Subatomic Particle From the Moment of Creation To the Death of the Universe and Beyond (1989). ISBN 0-385-29757-2 (hardcover)

Juvenile books

- Beyond 2000 series (1995–96)
  - Micromachines and Nanotechnology: The Amazing New World of the Ultrasmall ISBN 0-87518-615-7
  - Genetic Engineering: Redrawing the Blueprint of Life ISBN 0-87518-614-9
  - The Health Revolution: Surgery and Medicine in the Twenty-first Century ISBN 0-87518-616-5
  - Computers of the Future: Intelligent Machines and Virtual Reality ISBN 0-87518-617-3
- Experiment! series (1991–92)
  - Spiderwebs to Skyscrapers: The Science of Structure ISBN 0-87518-478-2
  - From Glasses to Gases: The Science of Matter ISBN 0-87518-500-2
  - Between Fire and Ice: The Science of Heat ISBN 0-87518-501-0
  - Sounds Interesting: The Science of Acoustics ISBN 0-87518-477-4
  - Up, Up and Away: The Science of Flight ISBN 0-87518-479-0
  - Making Light Work: The Science of Optics ISBN 0-87518-476-6
- Could You Ever? series (1990–91)
  - Could You Ever Live Forever? ISBN 0-87518-457-X
  - Could You Ever Build a Time Machine? ISBN 0-87518-456-1
  - Could You Ever Travel To the Stars? ISBN 0-87518-446-4
  - Could You Ever Meet an Alien? ISBN 0-87518-447-2
  - Could You Ever Speak Chimpanzee? ISBN 0-87518-448-0
  - Could You Ever Dig a Hole To China? ISBN 0-87518-449-9
- The World of Computers series (1986)
  - Inside Computers: Hardware and Software ISBN 0-87518-312-3
  - The Microchip Revolution ISBN 0-87518-313-1
  - Computers At Home: Today and Tomorrow ISBN 0-87518-314-X
  - Robots and the Intelligent Computer ISBN 0-87518-315-8
  - Fast, Faster, Fastest: The Story of Supercomputers ISBN 0-87518-316-6
- Discovering Our Universe series (1984–85)
  - The Sun: Our Neighborhood Star ISBN 0-87518-261-5
  - The Moon: A Spaceflight Away ISBN 0-87518-262-3
  - Comets, Meteors, and Asteroids: Rocks in Space ISBN 0-87518-264-X
  - The Planets: The Next Frontier ISBN 0-87518-263-1
  - Where Are We Going in Space ISBN 0-87518-265-8
  - Stars: From Birth to Black Hole ISBN 0-87518-284-4
  - Galaxies: Cities of Stars ISBN 0-87518-285-2
  - The Universe: Past, Present, and Future ISBN 0-87518-286-0
  - The New Astronomy: An Ever-Changing Universe ISBN 0-87518-288-7
  - Other Worlds: Is There Life Out There? ISBN 0-87518-287-9
