= Nob Yoshigahara Puzzle Design Competition =

Annual mechanical puzzle competition

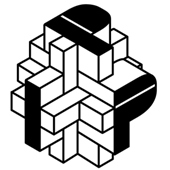
- Status: active
- Genre: Puzzle Competition
- Begins: 2001
- Frequency: annually
- Founder: Jerry Slocum, International Puzzle Collectors Association
- Most recent: August 2019
- Previous event: Kanazawa, Japan, "IPP39"
- Next event: online
- Leader: Nick Baxter
- People: committee members are Oskar van Deventer, Gary Foshee, Marcel Gillen, Brian Pletcher, and Naoaki Takashima
- Website: puzzleworld.org/DesignCompetition/
- also known as 'International Puzzle Party' (IPP)

Nob Yoshigahara Puzzle Design Competition is an annual award and competition in the engineering and design of mechanical puzzles. The location of the competition rotates between North America, Europe, and Japan. It was founded in 2001, and has been known since 2005 as the Nob Yoshigahara Puzzle Design Competition, after the renowned puzzler Nob Yoshigahara.

The competition is held in conjunction with International Puzzle Parties founded by Jerry Slocum in 1978, an event dedicated to discussing, showing, and trading of mechanical puzzles. Due to the postponement of the 2020 International Puzzle Party as a result of the COVID-19 pandemic the 2020 competition was held online only and not in conjunction with the puzzle party event.

== 2019 winners ==
The 2019 competition had 61 entries. The judging took place at the IPP39 which took place in Kanazawa, Japan in August 2019. The Puzzlers' Award went to Koichi Miura for his puzzle 4L Basket. The Jury Grand Prize was given to Slammed Car by Juniche Yananose. The Jury 1st Prize was shared by Laszlo Mero, Gergely Kapolnas and Imre Kokenyesi for Mondrian Blocks, and ali Morris for HoKey CoKey Lock by ali Morris.

Mazeburr L and Rotor were Jury Honorable Mentions created by Diniar Namdarian and Kyoo Wong, respectively.

== 2018 winners ==
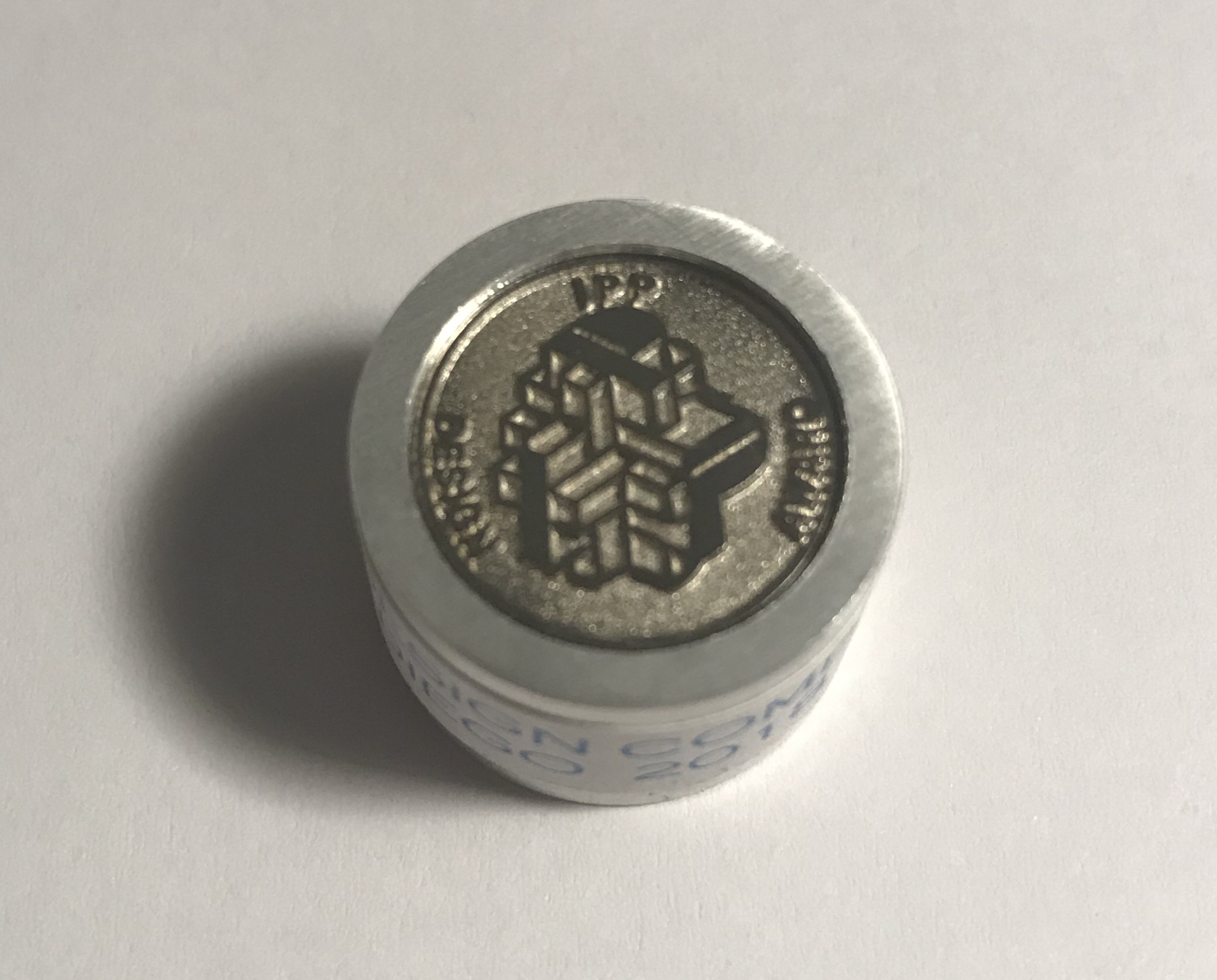
Award 2018 San Diego from Nob Yoshigahara Puzzle Design Competition

The Puzzle of the Year (Jury Grand Prize and Puzzlers’ Award) went to Casino by Volker Latussek. The Grand Jury 1st Prize was awarded to both the 5L Box by Hajime Katsumoto and Trinity by Kyoo Wong.

Jury Honorable Mentions went to: Auzzle A2 by Ilya Osipov, Jigsaw Puzzle 29 by Yuu Asaka, Nosey Puzzle by Alexander E Holroyd, and TicTac's Tactics by Eric Harshbarger.

== 2017 winners ==
Puzzlers' Award: Identical Twins by Osanori Yamamoto; Jury Grand Prize: Kakoi by Shiro Tajima; Jury 1st Prize: Barreled Bolt by Eitan Cher and David Tzur, No Full Pirouette! by Namick Salakhov; Jury Honorable Mention: BurrNova by Jerry McFarland, Free Me 5 by Joe Turner, Puzzle Bracelet by Yael Friedman, and In a Cage by Shiro Tajima.

== Logo Design ==
The official logo of the Nob Yoshigahara Puzzle Design Competition was designed by Gianni A. Sarcone, an artist and author specialising in visual perception and optical art. The design reflects the complexity and playful character of the puzzles featured in the competition.

== See also ==
- World Puzzle Championship
- World Sudoku Championship
- National Puzzlers' League (NPL)
