= Lloyd King (puzzle designer) =

Lloyd King is a British puzzle designer. King specialises in creating novel and unusual puzzles with "Aha!" answers. Most of his puzzles require lateral and "outside the box" thinking. Many lateral thinking puzzles are open ended, with numerous possible correct answers, but King strives to create puzzles with a single answer, which should become obvious with the illuminating "Aha!" moment on discovering the solution to a puzzle.

King was born in Hambleden, England and later resided in Queensland, Australia. King has written a number of books, and his puzzles are often quoted and used as illustrative examples in works by other authors, including "Riddles of the Sphinx" by David J Bodycombe. King's puzzles have also appeared in the "Get Smart in a Week" creativity test on BBC1 in 2006, in OMNI, The Times, The Independent, GAMES and various other publications, games and advertising.

== Bibliography ==
- Puzzles for the High IQ (1996)
- Ejercisios De Inteligencia Asociativa
- Mind-Bending Lateral and Logic Puzzles (2001)
- Mind-Bending Superquick Puzzles (2001)
- Time Critical Thinking Puzzles (2001)
- Kids IQ Puzzles (2001)
- Test Your Creative Thinking (2003)
- Amazing "Aha!" Puzzles (2004)
