= Edmé-Gilles Guyot =

Edmé-Gilles Guyot (1706–1786) was a French mail clerk, physician, postmaster, cartographer, inventor and author on the subject of mathematics, physics and magic. He experimented with optical illusions and with the theory behind performance magic. His developments into the apparent appearance of ghosts, using the projection of a figure into smoke, helped to create the technology and techniques used in phantasmagoria.

== Mathematics, science, and magic ==
Manufacturer of conjuring apparatus and scientific instruments, Guyot was accused of exploiting and revealing the tricks used at the time by magicians and science populizers like Nicolas-Philippe Ledru and François Pelletier. He created "magic theatres" for the aristocracy – small boxes that use lanterns and slides to create an animated story. Guyot's work was influential in the development of magic lanterns and their use in phantasmagoria. In 1770 he detailed a method of simultaneously using two different slides in this early projection device. His example was a sea that would become increasingly stormy, throwing around the ships that were sailing on it. He advised that the slides would need to be very carefully painted in order to create a realistic and beautiful animation. His writings on the subject were translated into English and German and were widely circulated around Europe. His experiments led to the technique of projecting images onto smoke to create the appearance of ghostly apparitions. In 1779 Guyot described the use of transformation slides in magic lanterns to create simple animations.

=== Nouvelles recreations physiques et mathematiques ===
Guyot's four part book Nouvelles recreations physiques et mathematiques featured descriptions of experiments and examples of how various innovative mathematical and magical tricks could be performed. The book was first published in 1769 and included an explanation of Hooper's paradox, It also includes detailed, illustrated techniques for the performance of the cups and balls trick that is regarded as being greatly influential.

The book was adapted into English by William Hooper, under the title Rational Recreations being released in 1774 without credit to Guyot.

== Medicine ==
Guyot is credited with describing in 1724 the catheterization of the Eustachian tube, one of the first means of middle ear inflation.

== Publications ==
- Edmé-Gilles Guyot (1799). Nouvelles récréations physiques et mathématiques (in French). Paris.
