= Jerry Slocum =

American historian, collector and author (born 1931)

- Born: July 5, 1931 (age 95); Chicago, Illinois, U.S.
- Known for: Puzzle collector, author
- Website: http://www.slocumpuzzles.com/

Jerry Slocum (born July 5, 1931) is an American historian, collector and author specializing on the field of mechanical puzzles. He worked as an engineer at Hughes Aircraft prior to retiring and dedicating his life to puzzles.

His personal puzzle collection, numbering over 40,000 mechanical puzzles and 4,500 books, is believed to be the world's largest. In 2006, the Association of Game & Puzzle Collectors awarded Slocum with the Sam Loyd Award.

In 2006, Slocum donated over 30,000 puzzles to the Lilly Library at Indiana University: marking the first time a major collection of puzzles was made available in an academic setting.

Slocum's first book, Puzzles Old and New, published in 1986, was the first comprehensive book to include all types of mechanical puzzles with hundreds of color illustrations of antique puzzles. In the introduction Martin Gardner predicted that the book would "remain a classic for decades."

Slocum has appeared on The Tonight Show Starring Johnny Carson, Martha Stewart Living, and eight other nationwide TV shows.

== Slocum Puzzle Foundation ==
In 1993, Slocum founded the Slocum Puzzle Foundation, a non-profit organization dedicated to educating the public on puzzles through puzzle collecting, exhibitions, publications, and communications.

== International Puzzle Party ==
Slocum also founded the International Puzzle Party in 1978. The first eight International Puzzle Parties (an event dedicated to discussing, showing, and trading mechanical puzzles) were held in Slocum's Beverly Hills living room and evolved into an annual by-invitation-only event rotating between North America, Europe, and Asia.

== Works ==
Slocum has authored or co-authored more than a dozen books on the topic of puzzles.

- Puzzles Old and New, with Jack Botermans (1986) ISBN 0295965797
- The Puzzle Arcade (1996) ISBN 157054056X
- The Tangram Book, with Dieter Gebhardt, Jack Botermans, Monica Ma, Xiaohe Ma 2003 ISBN 1-4027-0413-5 Sterling Publishing Company (Comprehensive, illustrated history, 1,756 problem figures) beautiful photos of historic Tangrams from Asia, Europe and America
- The 15 Puzzle, with Dic Sonneveld, 2006 ISBN 1-890980-15-3 Slocum Puzzle Foundation.
- The Cube: The Ultimate Guide to the World's Bestselling Puzzle, with David Singmaster, Wei-Hwa Huang, Dieter Gebhardt, Geert Hellings, and an introduction by Ernő Rubik, 2006 ISBN 978-1-57912-805-0, Black Dog & Leventhal Publishers, Inc. Covers the history of the Rubik's Cube, with solutions to the 2x2 and 3x3 puzzles.

== See also ==
- Nob Yoshigahara Puzzle Design Competition
