= Sam Loyd =

American chess player, composer, puzzle author and mathematician (1841-1911)

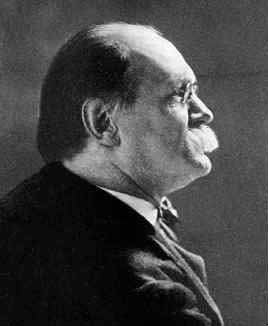
- Born: Samuel Loyd; January 30, 1841; Philadelphia, United States
- Died: April 11, 1911 (aged 70)
- Known for: Chess; puzzles; mathematical games

Samuel Loyd (January 30, 1841 – April 10, 1911) was an American chess player, chess composer, puzzle author, and recreational mathematician. Loyd was born in Philadelphia but raised in New York City.

As a chess composer, he authored a number of chess problems, often with interesting themes. At his peak, Loyd was one of the best chess players in the US, and he was ranked 15th in the world, according to chessmetrics.com.

He played in the strong Paris 1867 chess tournament (won by Ignatz von Kolisch) with little success, placing near the bottom of the field.

Following his death, his book Cyclopedia of 5000 Puzzles was published (1914) by his son, Samuel Loyd Jr. His son, named after his father, dropped the "Jr" from his name and started publishing reprints of his father's puzzles. Loyd (senior) was inducted into the US Chess Hall of Fame in 1987.

== Reputation ==
Loyd is widely acknowledged as one of America's great puzzle writers and popularizers, often mentioned as the greatest. Martin Gardner featured Loyd in his August 1957 Mathematical Games column in Scientific American and called him "America's greatest puzzler". In 1898, The Strand dubbed him "the prince of puzzlers". As a chess problemist, his composing style is distinguished by wit and humour.

He is also known for lies and self-promotion, however, and he has been criticized on these grounds—Martin Gardner's assessment continues "but also obviously a hustler". Canadian puzzler Mel Stover called Loyd "an old reprobate", and Matthew Costello called him "puzzledom's greatest celebrity... popularizer, genius", but also a "huckster" and "fast-talking snake oil salesman".

He collaborated with puzzler Henry Dudeney for a while, but Dudeney broke off the correspondence and accused Loyd of stealing his puzzles and publishing them under his own name. Dudeney despised Loyd so intensely that he equated him with the devil.

Loyd claimed that he invented the fifteen tiles in the box and one space puzzle. The actual inventor was Noyes Chapman, who applied for a patent in March 1880.

An enthusiast of tangram puzzles, Loyd popularized them with The Eighth Book Of Tan, a book of seven hundred unique tangram designs and a fanciful history of the origin of the tangram, claiming that the puzzle was invented 4,000 years ago by a god named Tan. This was presented as true and has been described as "Sam Loyd's Most Successful Hoax".

== Chess problems ==
=== Excelsior problem ===
"Excelsior"

Position: a8 black knight, c8 black rook, d8 black bishop, b7 black pawn, f7 black pawn, h7 black pawn, b6 black pawn, b5 white rook, h5 white king, a3 black pawn, e3 black pawn, g3 white pawn, h3 white knight, b2 white pawn, c2 white pawn, e2 white rook, a1 white knight, h1 black king

Mate in 5, 2nd prize, Paris Tourney, 1867
(For the solution, see "Excelsior".)

One of his best-known chess problems is the following, called "Excelsior" by Loyd after the poem by Henry Wadsworth Longfellow. White is to move and checkmate Black in five moves against any defense.

Loyd bet a friend that he could not pick a piece that didn't give mate in the main line, and when it was published in 1861 it was with the stipulation that White mates with "the least likely piece or pawn".

=== Steinitz Gambit problem ===
"Steinitz Gambit"

Position: e8 black rook, g8 black bishop, b7 black pawn, g7 white bishop, a6 black pawn, b6 white knight, e6 black pawn, f6 white rook, a5 white rook, b5 white bishop, e5 black king, b4 white pawn, e4 white knight, h4 black pawn, c3 black pawn, g3 black bishop, a2 black knight, d2 white pawn, f2 black pawn, h2 black rook, f1 white king, h1 black knight

Mate in 3, 1st prize, Checkmate Novelty Tourney, 1903

One of the most famous chess problems by Loyd. He wrote on this problem: "The originality of the problem is due to the White King being placed in absolute safety, and yet coming out on a reckless career, with no immediate threat and in the face of innumerable checks."

=== Charles XII problem ===
Position: g7 white rook, h6 black pawn, f5 white king, h5 black king, g3 black pawn, f2 black bishop, g2 white pawn, h2 white pawn, e1 white knight

This problem was originally published in 1859. The story involves a chess incident during the siege of Charles XII of Sweden by the Turks at Bender in 1713. "Charles beguiled this period by means of drills and chess, and used frequently to play with his minister, Christian Albert Grosthusen, some of the contests being mentioned by Voltaire. One day while so engaged, the game had been played to this stage, and Charles (White) had just announced checkmate in three."

1. Rxg3 Bxg3
2. Nf3 Bxh2
3. g4#

Position: g7 white rook, h6 black pawn, f5 white king, h5 black king, g3 black pawn, f2 black bishop, g2 white pawn, h2 white pawn

"Scarcely had he uttered the words, when a (Turkish) bullet, shattering the window, dashed the White knight off of the board in fragments. Grothusen started violently, but Charles, with utmost coolness, begged him to put back the other knight and work out the mate, observing that it was pretty enough. But another glance at the board made Charles smile. We do not need the knight. I can give it to you and still mate in four!"

1. hxg3 Be3
2. Rg4 Bg5
3. Rh4+ Bxh4
4. g4#

Position: g7 white rook, h6 black pawn, f5 white king, h5 black king, g3 black pawn, f2 black bishop, g2 white pawn

Who would believe it, he had scarcely spoken when another bullet flew across the room, and the pawn at h2 shared the fate of the knight. Grothusen turned pale. "You have our good friends the Turks with you," said the king unconcerned, "it can scarcely be expected that I should contend against such odds; but let me see if I can dispense with that pawn. I have it!" he shouted with a laugh, "I have great pleasure in informing you that there is undoubtedly a mate in 5."

1. Rb7 Be3
2. Rb1 Bg5
3. Rh1+ Bh4
4. Rh2 gxh2
5. g4#

Position: h6 black pawn, f5 white king, h5 black king, g3 black pawn, f2 black bishop, g2 white pawn, h2 white pawn, e1 white knight

In 1900, Friedrich Amelung pointed out that in the original position, if the first bullet had struck the rook instead of the knight, Charles would still have a mate in six.

1. Nf3 Be1
2. Nxe1 Kh4
3. h3 Kh5
4. Nd3 Kh4
5. Nf4 h5
6. Ng6#

Position: g7 white rook, h6 black pawn, f5 white king, h5 black king, g3 black pawn, f2 black bishop, h2 white pawn

In 2003, ChessBase posted a fifth variation, attributed to Brian Stewart. After the first bullet took out the knight, if the second had removed the g-pawn rather than the h-pawn, Charles would be able to mate in ten.

1. hxg3 Be1
2. Rg4 Bxg3
3. Rxg3 Kh4
4. Kf4 h5
5. Rg2 Kh3
6. Kf3 h4
7. Rg4 Kh2
8. Rxh4+ Kg1
9. Rh3 Kf1
10. Rh1#

== Puzzles ==
=== Back from the Klondike ===
"Back from the Klondike" puzzle (modern rendering)

This is one of Sam Loyd's most famous puzzles, first printed in the New York Journal and Advertiser, April 24, 1898 (as far as available evidence indicates). Loyd's original instructions were to:

Start from that heart in the center and go three steps in a straight line in any one of the eight directions, north, south, east or west, or on the bias, as the ladies say, northeast, northwest, southeast or southwest. When you have gone three steps in a straight line, you will reach a square with a number on it, which indicates the second day's journey, as many steps as it tells, in a straight line in any of the eight directions. From this new point when reached, march on again according to the number indicated, and continue on, following the requirements of the numbers reached, until you come upon a square with a number which will carry you just one step beyond the border, when you are supposed to be out of the woods and can holler all you want, as you will have solved the puzzle.

=== Vanishing puzzles ===
A vanishing puzzle is a mechanical optical illusion showing different numbers of a certain object when parts of the puzzle are moved around.

Interactive SVG of The Disappearing Bicyclist – in the SVG file, move the pointer to rotate the disc

Loyd patented rotary vanishing puzzles in 1896 and published versions named Get Off the Earth, Teddy and the Lion and The Disappearing Bicyclist (pictured). Each had a circular card connected to a cardboard backdrop with a pin, letting it rotate. In the Disappearing Bicyclist, when the disc is rotated such that the arrow points to A, 13 boys can be seen. When rotated so that the arrow points to B, only 12 boys appear.

==== Vanishing area puzzle ====
Chessboard paradox

A square with a side length of 8 units ("chessboard") is dissected into four pieces, which can be assembled into a 5x13 rectangle. Since the area of the square is 64 units but the area of the rectangle is 65 units, this seems paradoxical at first. It is just an optical illusion, however, as the pieces don't fit exactly to form a rectangle, but leave a small barely visible gap along the diagonal. This puzzle is also known as the chessboard paradox or paradox of Loyd and Schlömilch.

=== Trick Donkeys problem ===
"Trick Donkeys" problem

One of Loyd's notable puzzles was the "Trick Donkeys". It was based on a similar puzzle involving dogs published in 1857. In the problem, the solver must cut the drawing along the dotted lines and rearrange the three pieces so that the riders appear to be riding the donkeys.

== Works by Sam Loyd ==
- Sam Loyd's Book of Tangram Puzzles (ISBN 0-486-22011-7)
- Mathematical Puzzles of Sam Loyd (ISBN 0-486-20498-7): selected and edited by Martin Gardner
- More Mathematical Puzzles of Sam Loyd (ISBN 0-486-20709-9): selected and edited by Martin Gardner
- The Puzzle King: Sam Loyd's Chess Problems and Selected Mathematical Puzzles (ISBN 1-886846-05-7): edited by Sid Pickard
- Sam Loyd's Cyclopedia of 5000 Puzzles, Tricks and Conundrums with Answers ISBN 0-923891-78-1 – Complete 1914 book (public domain) scanned
- The 8th Book of Tan (1903).

== Works about Sam Loyd ==
- The 15 Puzzle (ISBN 1-890980-15-3): by Jerry Slocum and Dic Sonneveld
- Sam Loyd and his Chess Problems by Alain C. White
- Sam Loyd: His Story and Best Problems, by Andrew Soltis, Chess Digest, 1995, ISBN 0-87568-267-7
- Index of Sam Loyd Math Puzzles, by Don Knuth

== Sam Loyd Award ==
The Association for Games & Puzzles International (previously the Association of Game & Puzzle Collectors, and prior to 1999, the American Game Collectors Association, AGCA), gives the Sam Loyd Award for promoting interest in mechanical puzzles through design, development, or manufacture. The following individuals have won it:

- (1998) Bill Ritchie
- (2000) Stewart Coffin
- (2003) Nob Yoshigahara
- (2006) Jerry Slocum
- (2009) Kagen Schaefer
- (2012) Will Shortz
- (2015) Gary Foshee
