= Three-dimensional edge-matching puzzle =

A three-dimensional edge-matching puzzle is a type of edge-matching puzzle or tiling puzzle involving tiling a three-dimensional area with (typically regular) polygonal pieces whose edges are distinguished with colors or patterns, in such a way that the edges of adjacent pieces match. Edge-matching puzzles are known to be NP-complete, and capable of conversion to and from equivalent jigsaw puzzles and polyomino packing puzzle.

Three-dimensional edge-matching puzzles are not currently under direct U.S. patent protection, since the 1892 patent by E. L. Thurston has expired.

Current examples of commercial three-dimensional edge-matching puzzles include the Dodek Duo, The Enigma, Mental Misery, and Kadon Enterprises' range of three-dimensional edge-matching puzzles.

== See also ==
- Edge-matching puzzle
- Domino tiling
