= Puzzle contest =

Puzzle contests are popular competitions in which the objective is to solve a puzzle within a given time limit, and to obtain the best possible score among all players.

== History ==
One of the earliest puzzle contests was held about 1910. The publisher of the New York Herald offered a $5 gold piece to the reader who could form the most words using the letters from the shortest verse in the Bible. More than 400 readers submitted identical solutions listing 2505 words, and the publisher was obliged to pay $5 to each of them, since no provision had been made for ties.

Puzzle contests started to gain widespread popularity in the 1920s, and in 1927 the tabloid newspaper the New York Evening Graphic offered $50,000 in a contest. By the 1940s and 1950s millions of players tried to solve puzzles published in a wide range of newspapers and magazines. The first puzzle contests in that era were designed primarily to boost the circulation of the magazine or newspaper. These contests were usually free to play.

The most popular contest of this era was the Tangle Towns contest. Shortly after the New York Herald Tribune started publishing Tangle Towns in September 1954, the number of readers went up 72,000 to over 400,000. It was believed the puzzle was directly responsible for this increase. These contests ran in newspapers in major cities. In this contest the names of local cities would be scrambled, such as WONKERY for NEW YORK. The player had to unscramble the name. As the contest progressed, two city names, and then three city names would all be scrambled together. The final tiebreaker would consist of several hundred letters from which the player would have to form 20 or 25 city names, with various scores assigned to different letters and letter combinations.

The largest prize ever paid in a puzzle contest is still the $190,000 prize offered in a 1947 contest sponsored by Unicorn Press. The final puzzle consisted of several dozen pictures which had to be identified. Then the resulting words had to be anagrammed in the style of a Word Rebus, with points added for each word used, and points deducted for individual letters that were included in the rebus. The puzzle was designed by William Sunners, a Brooklyn schoolteacher for a fee of $15,000 (roughly 4 years salary in that era).

In the 1950s the focus of puzzle contests became fund-raising. Organizations such as the Boy Scouts and the Salvation Army would advertise their contests in large-circulation magazines. These contests either had an entry fee to play, or required a donation to the sponsoring organization. The most popular format for these contests was a picture composed of digits. The player had to correctly add all of the digits. The final tiebreaker would require the player to draw a path through a grid of several hundred numbers to obtain the highest possible total.

== Modern era ==
The current era of puzzle contests, in which the contests are conducted almost entirely by mail, began in the early 1970s. A promoter of packaged vacation tours called American Holiday Association (AHA) decided to use a puzzle contest to publicize its holiday packages. The puzzle contest proved so popular, that eventually AHA dropped its vacation business and became exclusively a puzzle contest promoter.

The best-known of the AHA contests was their BINGO format word grid. In the first round the player had to fill in 5 words into the 5x5 grid, meshing with the word BINGO that had already been filled into the left column. Since there were only 2 words in the word list starting with B, only 2 words with I, etc., no real skill was required. The second round was similar, with BINGO filled in the diagonal. Again, there were only 2 words starting with B, only 2 words with I in the second position, and so forth.

At their peak, around 1985-90, the AHA contests drew about 100,000 players in each contest, with a new contest starting every week.

The Diamond Dilemma was a 160-piece 3d triangular tiling puzzle with a £250,000 prize for a full solution. The prize went unclaimed by the 1990 deadline, though prizes for easier subproblems were awarded.

The Eternity puzzle (1999) and Eternity II puzzle (2007) were a 209-piece tiling and a 256-piece edge-matching puzzle developed by Christopher Monckton, for which a £1 million and $2 million prize could be won. The first competition was won by a pair of mathematicians, the second went unsolved.

== See also ==
- Puzzlehunt
