= Eternity puzzle =

Tiling puzzle

An empty Eternity board

The Eternity puzzle is a tiling puzzle created by the Viscount Monckton of Brenchley and launched by the Ertl Company in June 1999. It was marketed as being practically unsolvable, with a £1 million prize on offer for whoever could solve it within four years. The prize was paid out in October 2000 for a winning solution arrived at by two mathematicians from Cambridge. A follow-up prize puzzle called Eternity II was launched in 2007.

== Description ==
The puzzle's scope was to fill a large equiangular (but not equilateral) dodecagon board with 209 puzzle pieces. The board is equipped with a triangular grid made of equilateral triangles. Its sides alternate in length: six sides coincide with the grid and are 7 triangles (placed edge-to-edge) long, while the other sides are slightly shorter and measure 8 triangles base-to-tip, which equals $4\sqrt{3} \approx 6.9$ edge lengths.

Each puzzle piece is a 12-polydrafter (dodecadrafter) made of twelve 30-60-90 triangles (that is, a continuous compound of twelve halves of equilateral triangles, restricted to the grid layout). Each piece has an area equal to that of 6 equilateral triangles, and the area of the entire dodecagon is exactly 209 * 6 = 1254 equilateral triangles' (or 2508 drafters) worth.

A hint piece was shown placed on every board and solution sheet, although it was not required to be placed there in any solution submission for the prize. Five other hints could be obtained by solving three smaller clue puzzles, which were sold separately.

== Solution ==
As soon as the puzzle was launched, an online community emerged devoted to solving it, centred on a mailing list on which many ideas and techniques were discussed. It was soon realised that it was trivial to fill the board almost completely, to an "end-game position" where an irregularly-shaped void had to be filled with only a few pieces, at which point the pieces left would be the "wrong shapes" to fill the remaining space. The hope of solving the end-game depended vitally on having pieces that were easy to tile together in a variety of shapes. Computer searches were carried out to find which pieces tiled well or badly, and these data used to alter otherwise-standard backtracking search programs to use the bad pieces first, in the hope of being left with only good pieces in the hard final part of the search.

The puzzle was solved on May 15, 2000, before the first deadline, by two Cambridge mathematicians, Alex Selby and Oliver Riordan. Key to their success was the mathematical rigour with which they approached the problem of determining the tileability of individual pieces and of empty regions within the board. These provided measures of the probability that a given piece could help to fill or 'tile' a given region, and the probability that a given region could be tiled by some combination of pieces. In the search for a solution, these probabilities were used to identify which partial tilings, out of a vast number explored by the computer program, were most likely to lead to a solution. A complete solution was obtained within seven months of development with the aid of two domestic PCs.

A second solution was found independently by Guenter Stertenbrink and submitted just 6 weeks later, on July 1, 2000. No other solutions have since been published, and the originally intended solution also remains unpublished.

Neither of the known solutions have any of the six hint pieces correctly placed. According to Alex Selby the puzzle was actually significantly easier to solve without enforcing any fixed hint pieces.

== Prize ==
The puzzle's inventor, Christopher Monckton, put up half the prize money himself, the other half being put up by underwriters in the London insurance market. According to Eternity's rules, possible solutions to the puzzle would be received by mail on September 21, 2000. If no correct solutions were opened, the mail for the next year would be kept until September 30, 2001, the process being repeated every year until 2003, after which no entries would be accepted.

Before marketing the puzzle, Monckton had thought that it would take at least three years before anyone could crack the puzzle. One estimate made at the time stated that the puzzle had 10^{500} possible attempts at a solution, and it would take longer than the lifetime of the Universe to calculate all of them even if you had a million computers.

Once solved, Monckton claimed that the earlier-than-expected solution had forced him to sell his 67-room house, Crimonmogate, to pay the prize. In 2006, he said that the claim had been a PR stunt to boost sales over Christmas, that the house's sale was unrelated to the prize as he was going to sell it anyway.

== Influence ==
The architectural design of the Perth Arena in Perth, Western Australia, was heavily influenced by the eternity puzzle; the exterior design is also strongly reflected throughout the main arena, foyers, breakout function rooms and the entrance to the venue.
