= Exact trigonometric values =

Trigonometric values in terms of square roots and fractions

In mathematics, the values of the trigonometric functions can be expressed approximately, as in $\cos (\pi/4) \approx 0.707$, or exactly, as in $\cos (\pi/ 4)= \sqrt 2 /2$. While trigonometric tables contain many approximate values, the exact values for certain angles can be expressed by a combination of arithmetic operations and square roots. The angles with trigonometric values that are expressible in this way are exactly those that can be constructed with a compass and straight edge, and the values are called constructible numbers.

== Common angles ==
The trigonometric functions of angles that are multiples of 15°, 18°, or 22.5° have simple algebraic values. These values are listed in the following table for angles from 0° to 45° (see below for proofs). In the table below, the label "Undefined" represents a ratio $1:0.$ If the codomain of the trigonometric functions is taken to be the real numbers these entries are undefined, whereas if the codomain is taken to be the projectively extended real numbers, these entries take the value $\infty$ (see division by zero).

Radians	Degrees	sin	cos	tan	cot	sec	csc
$0$	$0^\circ$	$0$	$1$	$0$	Undefined	$1$	Undefined
$\frac{\pi}{12}$	$15^\circ$	$\frac{\sqrt{2} (\sqrt{3} - 1)} {4}$	$\frac{\sqrt{2} (\sqrt{3} + 1)} {4}$	$2 - \sqrt3$	$2 + \sqrt3$	$\sqrt2(\sqrt3 - 1)$	$\sqrt2(\sqrt3 + 1)$
$\frac{\pi}{10}$	$18^\circ$	$\frac{\sqrt5 - 1} {4}$	$\frac{\sqrt2 \sqrt{5 + \sqrt5}} {4}$	$\frac{\sqrt5 \sqrt{5 - 2\sqrt5}} {5}$	$\sqrt{5 + 2\sqrt5}$	$\frac{\sqrt{10} \sqrt{5 - \sqrt5}} {5}$	$\sqrt5 + 1$
$\frac{\pi}{8}$	$22.5^\circ$	$\frac{\sqrt{2 - \sqrt2}} {2}$	$\frac{\sqrt{2 + \sqrt2}} {2}$	$\sqrt2 - 1$	$\sqrt2 + 1$	$\sqrt2 \sqrt{2 - \sqrt2}$	$\sqrt2 \sqrt{2 + \sqrt2}$
$\frac{\pi}{6}$	$30^\circ$	$\frac{1}{2}$	$\frac{\sqrt3}{2}$	$\frac{1}{\sqrt3}$	$\sqrt3$	$\frac{2}{\sqrt3}$	$2$
$\frac{\pi}{5}$	$36^\circ$	$\frac{\sqrt2 \sqrt{5 - \sqrt5}} {4}$	$\frac{\sqrt5 + 1} {4}$	$\sqrt{5 - 2\sqrt5}$	$\frac{\sqrt5 \sqrt{5 + 2\sqrt5}} {5}$	$\sqrt5 - 1$	$\frac{\sqrt{10} \sqrt{5 + \sqrt5}} {5}$
$\frac{\pi}{4}$	$45^\circ$	$\frac{1}{\sqrt2}$		$1$		$\sqrt2$	

For angles outside of this range, trigonometric values can be found by applying reflection and shift identities, such as

$$\begin{alignat}{3}
&&\sin(\tfrac{\pi}{2} - \theta)  &{}= \cos(\theta), \\[5mu]
&&\sin(2\pi + \theta)  &{}= \sin(\pi - \theta) &&{}=  \sin(\theta), \quad
&&\sin(\pi + \theta)  &&{}= \sin(-\theta)      &&{}= -\sin(\theta), \\[5mu]
&&\cos(2\pi + \theta)  &{}= \cos(-\theta)      &&{}=  \cos(\theta), \quad
&&\cos(\pi + \theta)  &&{}= \cos(\pi - \theta) &&{}= -\cos(\theta).
\end{alignat}$$

For example, for any θ greater than π/4, to find its sine, follow these steps to instead operate within the range of 0 to π/4:

1. While it is greater than 2π, subtract 2π from it. Now try to find sin(θ).
2. If it is greater than π, subtract π from it and try to find −sin(θ).
3. If it is greater than π/2, subtract π/2 from it and try to find cos(θ).
4. If it is greater than π/4, subtract it from π/2. If you are trying to find cosine due to step 3, now try to find sin(θ). If you are trying to find sine because you did not enter step 3, try to find cos(θ).

== Trigonometric numbers ==
A trigonometric number is a number that can be expressed as the sine or cosine of a rational multiple of π radians. Since $\sin(x)=\cos(x-\pi/2),$ the case of a sine can be omitted from this definition. Therefore any trigonometric number can be written as $\cos(2\pi k/n)$, where k and n are integers. This number can be thought of as the real part of the complex number $\cos(2\pi k/n) + i \sin(2\pi k/n)$. De Moivre's formula shows that numbers of this form are roots of unity:

$$\left(\cos\left(\frac{2\pi k}{n}\right) + i \sin\left(\frac{2\pi k}{n}\right)\right)^n = \cos(2\pi k) + i \sin(2\pi k) = 1.$$

(Conversely, the real part of any root of unity is a trigonometric number.) Since the root of unity is a root of the polynomial x^{n} − 1, it is algebraic. Since the trigonometric number is the average of the root of unity and its complex conjugate, and algebraic numbers are closed under arithmetic operations, every trigonometric number is algebraic. The minimal polynomials of trigonometric numbers can be explicitly enumerated. In contrast, by the Lindemann–Weierstrass theorem, the sine or cosine of any non-zero algebraic number is always transcendental.

By Niven's theorem, the only rational trigonometric numbers are 0, 1, −1, 1/2, and −1/2.

== Constructibility ==
An angle can be constructed with a compass and straightedge if and only if its sine (or equivalently cosine) can be expressed by a combination of arithmetic operations and square roots applied to integers. Additionally, an angle that is a rational multiple of $\pi$ radians is constructible if and only if, when it is expressed as $a\pi/b$ radians, where a and b are relatively prime integers, the prime factorization of the denominator, b, is the product of some power of two and any number of distinct Fermat primes (a Fermat prime is a prime number one greater than a power of two).

Thus, for example, $2\pi/15 = 24^\circ$ is a constructible angle because 15 is the product of the Fermat primes 3 and 5. Similarly $\pi/12 = 15^\circ$ is a constructible angle because 12 is a power of two (4) times a Fermat prime (3). But $\pi/9 = 20^\circ$ is not a constructible angle, since $9 = 3 \cdot 3$ is not the product of distinct Fermat primes as it contains 3 as a factor twice, and neither is $\pi/7 \approx 25.714^\circ$, since 7 is not a Fermat prime.

It results from the above characterisation that an angle of an integer number of degrees is constructible if and only if this number of degrees is a multiple of 3.

== Constructible values ==
=== 45° ===
From a reflection identity, $\cos(45^\circ) = \sin(90^\circ-45^\circ)=\sin(45^\circ)$. Substituting into the Pythagorean trigonometric identity $\sin(45^\circ)^2 + \cos(45^\circ)^2=1$, one obtains the minimal polynomial $2 \sin(45^\circ)^2 - 1 = 0$. Taking the positive root, one finds $\sin(45^\circ) = \cos(45^\circ) = 1/\sqrt{2} = \sqrt{2}/2$.

A geometric way of deriving the sine or cosine of 45° is by considering an isosceles right triangle with leg length 1. Since two of the angles in an isosceles triangle are equal, if the remaining angle is 90° for a right triangle, then the two equal angles are each 45°. Then by the Pythagorean theorem, the length of the hypotenuse of such a triangle is $\sqrt{2}$. Scaling the triangle so that its hypotenuse has a length of 1 divides the lengths by $\sqrt{2}$, giving the same value for the sine or cosine of 45° given above.

=== 30° and 60° ===
The values of sine and cosine of 30 and 60 degrees are derived by analysis of the equilateral triangle. In an equilateral triangle, the 3 angles are equal and sum to 180°, therefore each corner angle is 60°. Bisecting one corner, the special right triangle with angles 30-60-90 is obtained. By symmetry, the bisected side is half of the side of the equilateral triangle, so one concludes $\sin(30^\circ)=1/2$. The Pythagorean and reflection identities then give $\sin(60^\circ)=\cos(30^\circ)=\sqrt{1-(1/2)^2}=\sqrt{3}/2$.

=== 18°, 36°, 54°, and 72° ===
The value of $\sin(18^\circ)$ may be derived using the multiple angle formulas for sine and cosine. By the double angle formula for sine:
$$\sin(36^\circ) = 2\sin(18^\circ)\cos(18^\circ)$$
By the triple angle formula for cosine:
$$\cos(54^\circ) = \cos^3(18^\circ) - 3\sin^2(18^\circ)\cos(18^\circ) = \cos(18^\circ)(1 - 4\sin^2(18^\circ))$$
Since sin(36°) = cos(54°), we equate these two expressions and cancel a factor of cos(18°):
$$2\sin(18^\circ) = 1 - 4\sin^2(18^\circ)$$
This quadratic equation has only one positive root:
$$\sin(18^\circ) = \frac{\sqrt{5}-1}{4}$$

The Pythagorean identity then gives $\cos(18^\circ)$, and the double and triple angle formulas give sine and cosine of 36°, 54°, and 72°. Then $\cos(36^\circ)=(\sqrt{5}+1)/4=\varphi/2$, where $\varphi$ is the golden ratio.

A geometric method of finding the sines of these angles comes from analyzing a regular pentagon. Two of its diagonals form an angle of 36° that can be inscribed in a circle, and one side of the pentagon forms a chord of the circle that subtends this inscribed angle. To compute the chord's length, form a quadrilateral from four points of the pentagon. If the diagonals each have a length of one, then applying Ptolemy's theorem to this quadrilateral gives the equation $x^2 + x - 1 = 0$, where x is the chord length. The positive root of this equation is this value:

$$\frac{\sqrt{5}-1}{2}$$

Bisecting the 36° angle then creates a right triangle with angles of 18° and 72°, and cuts the chord in half, giving the same value for the sine of 18° given above. The sine value of 72° then follows from the Pythagorean theorem, and the sine values for 36° and 54° follow from sin(18°) and the double- and triple-angle formulas.

=== Remaining multiples of 3° ===
Wikimedia Commons has a file available for a table of these exact values.

The sines and cosines of all other angles between 0 and 90° that are multiples of 3° can be derived from the angles described above and the sum and difference formulas. Specifically,

$$\begin{align}
3^\circ &= 18^\circ-15^\circ, &
24^\circ &= 60^\circ - 36^\circ, &
51^\circ &= 36^\circ + 15^\circ, &
78^\circ &= 60^\circ + 18^\circ, &
\\
6^\circ &= 36^\circ - 30^\circ, &
27^\circ &= 45^\circ - 18^\circ, &
57^\circ &= 75^\circ - 18^\circ, &
81^\circ &= 45^\circ + 36^\circ, &
\\
9^\circ &= 45^\circ - 36^\circ, &
33^\circ &= 18^\circ + 15^\circ, &
63^\circ &= 45^\circ + 18^\circ, &
84^\circ &= 54^\circ + 30^\circ, &
\\
12^\circ &= 30^\circ - 18^\circ, &
39^\circ &= 54^\circ - 15^\circ, &
66^\circ &= 36^\circ + 30^\circ, &
87^\circ &= 72^\circ + 15^\circ. &
\\
15^\circ &= 45^\circ - 30^\circ, &
42^\circ &= 60^\circ - 18^\circ, &
69^\circ &= 54^\circ + 15^\circ, &
\\
21^\circ &= 36^\circ - 15^\circ, &
48^\circ &= 30^\circ + 18^\circ, &
75^\circ &= 45^\circ + 30^\circ, &
\end{align}$$

For example, since $24^\circ = 60^\circ - 36^\circ$, its cosine can be derived by the cosine difference formula:
$$\begin{align}\cos(24^\circ) &= \cos(60^\circ)\cos(36^\circ) + \sin(60^\circ)\sin(36^\circ) \\[4mu]
&= \frac{1}{2}\frac{\sqrt{5}+1}{4}+\frac{\sqrt{3}}{2}\frac{\sqrt{10-2\sqrt{5}}}{4}\\[6mu]
&= \frac{1 + \sqrt{5} + \sqrt{30-6\sqrt{5}}}{8}\end{align}$$

=== Half angles ===
If the denominator, b, is multiplied by additional factors of 2, the sine and cosine can be derived with the half-angle formulas. For example, 22.5° (π/8 rad) is half of 45°, so its sine and cosine are:

$$\begin{align}
\sin(22.5^\circ) &= \sqrt{\frac12\bigl(1 - \cos(45^\circ)\bigr)}
= \sqrt{\frac12\left(1 - \frac{\sqrt2}{2}\right)}
= \frac12\sqrt{2-\sqrt2} \\
\cos(22.5^\circ) &= \sqrt{\frac12\bigl(1 + \cos(45^\circ)\bigr)}
= \sqrt{\frac12\left(1 + \frac{\sqrt2}{2}\right)}
= \frac12\sqrt{2+\sqrt2}
\end{align}$$

Repeated application of the half-angle formulas leads to nested radicals, specifically nested square roots of 2 of the form $\sqrt{2 \pm \cdots}$. In general, the sine and cosine of most angles of the form $\beta / 2^n$ can be expressed using nested square roots of 2 in terms of $\beta$. Specifically, if one can write an angle as
$$\alpha = \pi \left(\frac{1}{2}-\sum_{i=1}^k \frac{\prod_{j=1}^i b_j}{2^{i+1}}\right) = \pi \left (\frac{1}{2} - \frac{b_1}{4} - \frac{b_1 b_2}{8} - \frac{b_1 b_2 b_3}{16} - \ldots - \frac{b_1 b_2 \ldots b_k}{2^{k+1}}\right)$$
where $b_k \in [-2,2]$ and $b_i$ is -1, 0, or 1 for $i<k$, then
$$\cos(\alpha) = \frac{b_1}{2}\sqrt{2+b_2 \sqrt{2+b_3 \sqrt{2+\ldots+b_{k-1} \sqrt{2+2 \sin\left(\frac{\pi b_k}{4}\right)}}}}$$
and if $b_1 \neq 0$ then
$$\sin(\alpha) = \frac{1}{2}\sqrt{2 - b_2 \sqrt{2+b_3 \sqrt{2+b_4 \sqrt{2+\ldots+b_{k-1} \sqrt{2+2 \sin\left(\frac{\pi b_k}{4}\right)}}}}}$$
For example, $\frac{13 \pi}{32} = \pi\left(\frac{1}{2}-\frac{1}{4}+\frac{1}{8}+\frac{1}{16}-\frac{1}{32}\right)$, so one has $(b_1,b_2,b_3,b_4)=(1,-1,1,-1)$ and obtains:
$$\begin{align}
\cos\left(\frac{13 \pi}{32}\right) &= \frac{1}{2}\sqrt{2-\sqrt{2+\sqrt{2+2 \sin\left(\frac{-\pi}{4}\right)}}} = \frac{1}{2}\sqrt{2-\sqrt{2+\sqrt{2-\sqrt{2}}}}\\
\sin\left(\frac{13 \pi}{32}\right) &= \frac{1}{2}\sqrt{2+\sqrt{2+\sqrt{2-\sqrt 2}}}
\end{align}$$

=== Denominator of 17 ===
Since 17 is a Fermat prime, a regular 17-gon is constructible, which means that the sines and cosines of angles such as $2\pi/17$ radians can be expressed in terms of square roots. In particular, in 1796, Carl Friedrich Gauss showed that:
$$\cos\left(\frac{2\pi}{17}\right) = \frac{-1+\sqrt{17}+\sqrt{34-2\sqrt{17}} + 2\sqrt{17+3\sqrt{17} - \sqrt{170+38\sqrt{17}}}}{16}$$

The sines and cosines of related constructible angles measuring $\textstyle k \pi / (17\cdot 2^n)$ radians (for integers $k$ and $n$) can be derived from this one.

== Non-constructibility of 1° ==
As discussed in § Constructibility, only certain angles that are rational multiples of $\pi$ radians have trigonometric values that can be expressed with square roots. The angle 1°, being $\pi/180 = \pi/(2^2 \cdot 3^2 \cdot 5)$ radians, has a repeated factor of 3 in the denominator and therefore $\sin(1^\circ)$ cannot be expressed using only square roots. A related question is whether it can be expressed using cube roots. The following two approaches can be used, but both result in an expression that involves the cube root of a complex number. Galois theory shows that the casus irreducibilis cannot be expressed in terms of solely real radicals.

Using the triple-angle identity, we can identify $\sin(1^\circ)$ as a root of a cubic polynomial: $\sin(3^\circ) = -4x^3 + 3x$. The three roots of this polynomial are $\sin(1^\circ)$, $\sin(59^\circ)$, and $-\sin(61^\circ)$. Since $\sin(3^\circ)$ is constructible, an expression for it could be plugged into Cardano's formula to yield an expression for $\sin(1^\circ)$. However, since all three roots of the cubic are real, this is an instance of casus irreducibilis, and the expression would require taking the cube root of a complex number.

Alternatively, by De Moivre's formula:

$$\begin{align}
(\cos(1^\circ) + i \sin(1^\circ))^3 &= \cos(3^\circ) + i \sin(3^\circ), \\[4mu]
(\cos(1^\circ) - i \sin(1^\circ))^3 &= \cos(3^\circ) - i \sin(3^\circ).
\end{align}$$

Taking cube roots and adding or subtracting the equations, we have:

$$\begin{align}
\cos(1^\circ) &= \;\frac{1}{2} \left(
\sqrt[3]{\cos(3^\circ) + i \sin(3^\circ)}
+ \sqrt[3]{\cos(3^\circ) - i \sin(3^\circ)} \right),
\\[5mu]
\sin(1^\circ) &= \frac{1}{2i}\left(
\sqrt[3]{\cos(3^\circ) + i \sin(3^\circ)}
- \sqrt[3]{\cos(3^\circ) - i \sin(3^\circ)} \right).
\end{align}$$

== See also ==
- Ailles rectangle, used to find exact values for multiples of 15°
- List of trigonometric identities

== Bibliography ==
- Lehmer, D. H. (1933). "A note on trigonometric algebraic numbers". American Mathematical Monthly. 40 (3): 165–166. doi:10.2307/2301023. JSTOR 2301023.
- Abramowitz, Milton; Stegun, Irene A., eds. (1972). Handbook of Mathematical Functions with Formulas, Graphs, and Mathematical Tables. New York: Dover Publications. ISBN 978-0-486-61272-0.
- Watkins, William; Zeitlin, Joel (1993). "The minimal polynomial of cos(2*π/n)". American Mathematical Monthly. 100 (5): 471–474. doi:10.2307/2324301. JSTOR 2324301.
- Girstmair, Kurt (1997). "Some linear relations between values of trigonometric functions at k*π/n" (PDF). Acta Arithmetica. 81 (4): 387–498. doi:10.4064/aa-81-4-387-398. MR 1472818.
- Conway, John H.; Radin, Charles; Sadun, Lorenzo (1999). "On angles whose squared trigonometric functions are rational". Discrete & Computational Geometry. 22 (3): 321–332. arXiv:math-ph/9812019. doi:10.1007/PL00009463. MR 1706614. S2CID 563915.
- Bracken, Paul; Cizek, Jiri (2002). "evaluation of quantum mechanical perturbative sums in terms of quadratic surds and their use in the approximation of ζ(3)/π^{3}". International Journal of Quantum Chemistry. 90: 42–53. doi:10.1002/qua.1803.
- Servi, L. D. (2003). "Nested square roots of 2". American Mathematical Monthly. 110 (4): 326–330. doi:10.2307/3647881. JSTOR 3647881.
- Beslin, Scott; de Angelis, Valerio (2004). "The minimal polynomials of sin(2*π/p) and cos(2*π/p)". Mathematics Magazine. 77 (2): 146–149. doi:10.1080/0025570X.2004.11953242. JSTOR 3219105. S2CID 118497912.
- Tangsupphathawat, Pinthira; Laohakosol, Vichian (2016). "Minimal polynomials of algebraic cosine values at rational multiples of π". Journal of Integer Sequences. 19: 16.2.8.
