= Contack =

Tabletop game

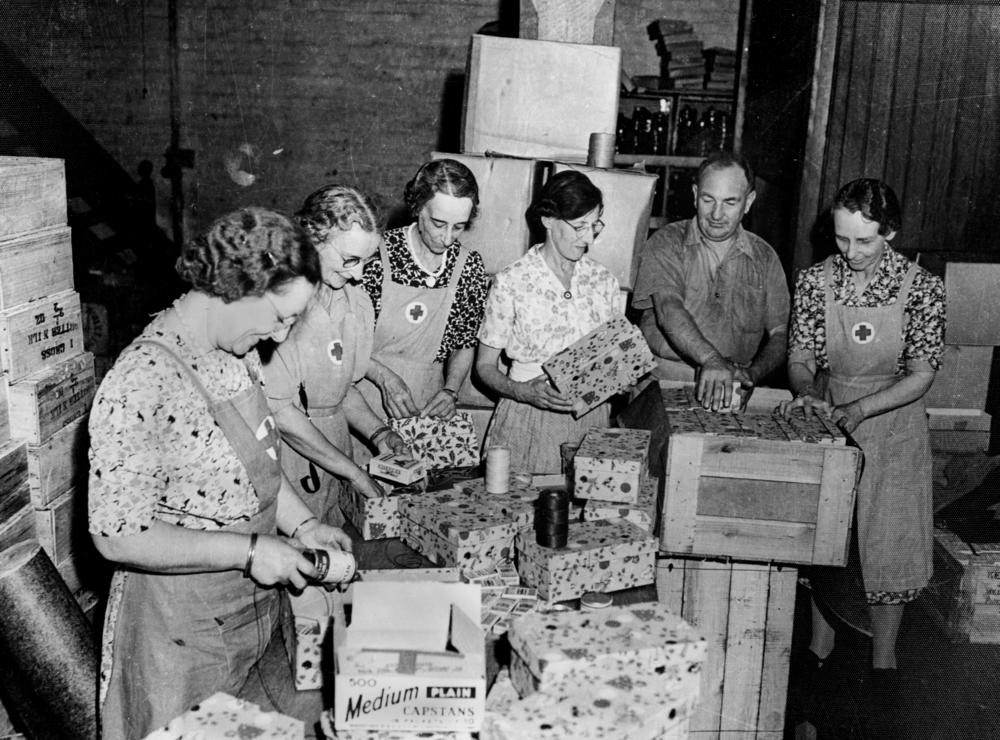
Australian Red Cross workers pack boxes for Christmas 1942, including Contack games

Contack is a dominoes-like game for one to seven players which was patented by Parker Brothers and published in 1939. It uses 36 equilateral triangle tiles; each side is assigned a different color and numerical value. Players take turns laying tiles from a hand of five next to tiles already on the table; newly-laid tiles must match the color of adjacent tile(s).

== Gameplay (multiplayer) ==
=== Setup ===
After flipping all tiles face-down and shuffling, each player draws five tiles, then displays them, face-up, keeping them visible to other players throughout the game. Play starts with the player holding the lowest-valued tile, computed by summing the three printed values for each side. That player places the lowest-valued tile on the table as the opening move of the hand.

=== Turns ===
Valid move sequence: 1. First player placed the 1-2-3 tile, shown on right.; 2. Second player placed the 9-2-8 tile, shown in middle, and scored 10 points for the summed value of the matched blue edges (1+9 is a multiple of 5).; 3. Third player placed the 9-5-8 tile, shown on left, scoring no points for matching values across the gold edges (8+8 is a match but not a multiple of 5).

Play proceeds clockwise; each player usually is required to place one of their tiles adjacent to the tile that was placed by the preceding player, taking care to match a colored edge and either one of the following two conditions:

1. Values must match ("Matching Game")
2. The sum of adjacent values must equal a multiple of 5 (5, 10, 15, etc. as the "Counting Game")

If the tile played simply matches values without summing to a multiple of 5, the placed tile earns no score for the player. However, if the sum of the adjacent matched edges is a multiple of 5, the player scores that sum for placing the tile. For example, 4-4 would score no points as a simple match, but 4-6 and 5-5 would each score ten points; although 5-5 is considered a match, its sum is also a multiple of 5.

If a player is unable to make any legal move, and that player has less than five tiles in their hand, they are required to draw from the pile of undrawn face-down tiles, placing the newly drawn tile(s) face-up in their hand until either they have five tiles or they draw a tile that can be played legally. If they re-fill their hand to five tiles without exposing a tile that can be played, they lose their turn and play continues clockwise. If the pile of face-down tiles has been exhausted, the hand proceeds as long as possible.

=== Adjacency ===
Opportunity Play examples

Ex. A: Scores 30 points for a two-tile adjacent opportunity play (10+10 for blue edges, 9+1 for gold edges)

Ex. B: Scores 50 points for a three-tile adjacent opportunity play (10+10 gold, 9+6 red, and 8+7 blue)

Normally, a player is required to play their tile adjacent to the tile that was placed during the preceding turn; however, when an "Opportunity Play" exists, that player may place their tile in a different location. This occurs when a player holds a tile that can contact two or three adjacent tiles. Scoring follows the same rules, including the matches that sum to a multiple of 5 on up to three edges.

The following player must then either play a tile adjacent to the tile played during the Opportunity Play, or take advantage of an Opportunity Play of their own. If the Opportunity Play placed a tile that leaves no exposed edges (i.e., played legally against three adjacent tiles), the following player must also play an Opportunity Play, or else the hand is over. Note that in Example B, illustrated above, the following player has no chance to make an Opportunity Play after the three-edge play, as there will be no open spaces with two adjacent edges, and so the hand is over following the triple edge Opportunity Play.

=== Ending the hand ===
The hand ends when one player has exhausted their hand by playing all their tiles, or when no player is able to make a legal move. Any players holding tiles at the end of a hand are assessed a penalty of 10 points per tile.

After three hands, the scores are summed, and the high scorer is declared the winner.

== Single-player variants ==
=== Draw solitaire ===
The connection game may be played by one person; after shuffling the face-down tiles, one tile is drawn at random to serve as the starting piece. This is followed by a repetitive draw-and-discard sequence: Another tile is drawn from the face-down pile. If this tile cannot be played legally (matching color and either matching values or values sum to a multiple of five), it is placed, face-up, in a discard pile, and another tile is drawn from the face-down pile. Again, if the newly drawn tile cannot be played, it is placed, face-up, on top of the existing discard pile, repeating the draw and discard until a tile is drawn that can be played.

After placing the second tile, the tile on top of the discard pile should be played if it can be placed legally next to the tile that was just played; otherwise, the draw-and-discard sequence should be repeated until a legal move is possible. Opportunity Plays (matching two or three edges) are allowed and follow the same rules as the multiplayer version. Play continues in this fashion until either all tiles have been played or there are no legal moves possible after exhausting the draw pile.

=== Stacked solitaire ===
After shuffling the tiles, divide them into seven stacks, face-up. Six stacks will have five tiles and one stack will have six tiles. Cut the six-tile stack at random and use that tile as the starting tile. The next tile may be selected from the top of any stack to complete a legal placement. Again, play continues in this manner until either all tiles have been played or there are no legal moves possible.

== Equipment ==
The game includes 36 triangular tiles. Each tile has a gold, red, or blue edge, and each edge is marked with a value ranging from 1 to 10. Each edge has a unique value, i.e., there are no tiles with two or more edges which have the same value. For example, the 01-01-01 tile does not exist. The nomenclature adopted here describes each tile by the values on the blue, red, and gold sides, respectively, starting with the value on the bottom edge (colored blue) and proceeding anti-clockwise.

Contack tiles
Other values Low value	02-03	03-04	04-05	05-06	06-07	07-08	08-09	09-10
01								
01	01-02-03	03-04-01	05-01-04	01-05-06	06-07-01	08-01-07	01-08-09	09-10-01
01	[ 01 -02-03]	[ 01 -03-04]	[ 01 -04-05]	[ 01 -05-06]	[ 01 -06-07]	[ 01 -07-08]	[ 01 -08-09]	[ 01 -09-10]
02								
02		02-03-04	04-05-02	06-02-05	02-06-07	07-08-02	09-02-08	02-09-10
02		[ 02 -03-04]	[ 02 -04-05]	[ 02 -05-06]	[ 02 -06-07]	[ 02 -07-08]	[ 02 -08-09]	[ 02 -09-10]
03								
03			03-04-05	05-06-03	07-03-06	03-07-08	08-09-03	10-03-09
03			[ 03 -04-05]	[ 03 -05-06]	[ 03 -06-07]	[ 03 -07-08]	[ 03 -08-09]	[ 03 -09-10]
04								
04				04-05-06	06-07-04	08-04-07	04-08-09	09-10-04
04				[ 04 -05-06]	[ 04 -06-07]	[ 04 -07-08]	[ 04 -08-09]	[ 04 -09-10]
05								
05					05-06-07	07-08-05	09-05-08	05-09-10
05					[ 05 -06-07]	[ 05 -07-08]	[ 05 -08-09]	[ 05 -09-10]
06								
06						06-07-08	08-09-06	10-06-09
06						[ 06 -07-08]	[ 06 -08-09]	[ 06 -09-10]
07								
07							07-08-09	09-10-07
07							[ 07 -08-09]	[ 07 -09-10]
08								
08								08-09-10
08								[ 08 -09-10]

By examination, the tiles also can be described starting from the lowest value and counting anti-clockwise; using this scheme, the edge value monotonically increases when moving anti-clockwise (i.e., the tile [01-03-04] exists but not [01-04-03]). The lowest value on the tile ranges from 1 to 8, and the other two values on the tile are sequential integers (i.e., [01-03-04] and [02-03-04] but not [01-03-05], [02-03-05], or [02-03-06]). Collectively, these reduce the number of potential tile patterns.

In addition, the tiles which have three sequential integers (e.g., [01-02-03] or [05-06-07]) always have the lowest value on the blue edge, and the next value sequence with the same lowest value (e.g., [01-03-04] and [05-07-08], respectively) move the lowest value to the gold edge; the next sequence (e.g. [01-04-05] and [05-08-09]) moves the lowest value to the red edge. In other words, the lowest value rotates sequentially clockwise, from the blue edge to the gold edge to the red edge, cycling back around to the blue edge, etc.

== See also ==
- Trioker, a domino-like game using similar equipment
- Triominoes, another domino-like game using similar equipment
