= T puzzle =

Tiling puzzle

The T-puzzle, a T shape can be assembled with the four pieces on the left.

The T puzzle is a tiling puzzle consisting of four polygonal shapes which can be put together to form a capital T. The four pieces are usually one isosceles right triangle, two right trapezoids and an irregular shaped pentagon.

Despite its apparent simplicity, it is a surprisingly hard puzzle of which the crux is the positioning of the irregular shaped piece. The earliest T puzzles date from around 1900 and were distributed as promotional giveaways. From the 1920s wooden specimen were produced and made available commercially. Most T puzzles come with a leaflet with additional figures to be constructed. Which shapes can be formed depends on the relative proportions of the different pieces.

== Origins and early history ==
=== The Latin Cross ===
The Latin cross puzzle (left) and the T puzzle (right).

The Latin cross puzzle consists of a reassembling a five-piece dissection of the cross with three isosceles right triangles, one right trapezoid and an irregular shaped six-sided piece (see figure). When the pieces of the cross puzzle have the right dimensions, they can also be put together as a rectangle. From Chinese origin, the oldest examples date from the first half of the nineteenth century. One of the earliest published descriptions of the puzzle appeared in 1826 in the 'Sequel to the Endless Amusement'. Many other references of the cross puzzle can be found in amusement, puzzle and magicians books throughout the 19th century. The T puzzle is based on the cross puzzle, but without head and has therefore only four pieces. Another difference is that in the dissection of the T, one of the triangles is usually elongated as a right trapezoid. These changes make the puzzle more difficult and clever than the cross puzzle.

=== Advertising premiums ===
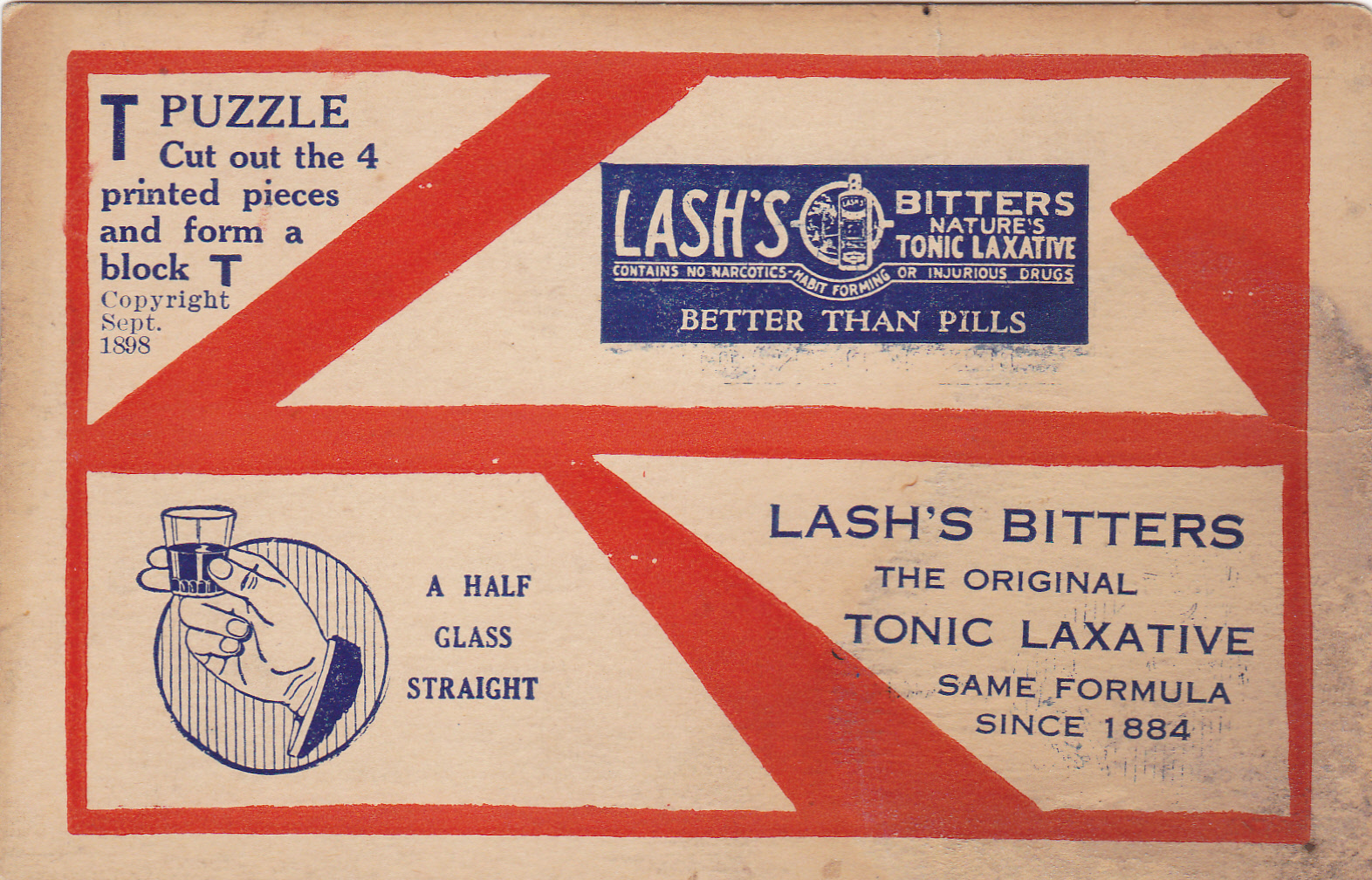
The Lash's Bitters T-puzzle, the earliest known version of the puzzle

The T-puzzle became very popular in the beginning of the 20th century as a giveaway item, with hundreds of different companies using it to promote their business or product. The pieces were made from paper or cardboard and served as trade cards, with advertisement printed on them. They usually came in an envelope with instructions and an invitation to write to or call at the company or local dealer for its solution. Examples include:

- Lash's Bitters – the original tonic laxative (1898). This is the earliest known version of the T-puzzle. The angles are cut at 35 degrees which makes the puzzle easier and less confusing.
- White Rose Ceylon tea, Seeman Brothers, New York (1903). This puzzle is often cited as being the oldest version of the T puzzle, but Lash's Bitters puzzle predates it.
- Armour's dry sausage, Armour and Company, Chicago. The text on the envelope reads "The Teaser T, Please accept this interesting little puzzle with our compliments. You will find it a real test to fit the four pieces enclosed in this envelope together to form this perfect letter 'T.' If you fail to solve it, ask your dealer for the solution. And to solve the problem of adding delicious meat dishes to your menu Ask your dealer for Armour's Dry Sausage".
- Larabee's best flour (1919).
- Waterall's T Puzzle Paints & Varnishes distributed by O.J. Miller & Son, Allentown, Pennsylvania. The envelope mentions that the puzzle is "highly entertaining, interesting, perplexing, aggravating and easy".
- Insurance company of Glens Falls T Puzzle, New York.

=== Early published references ===
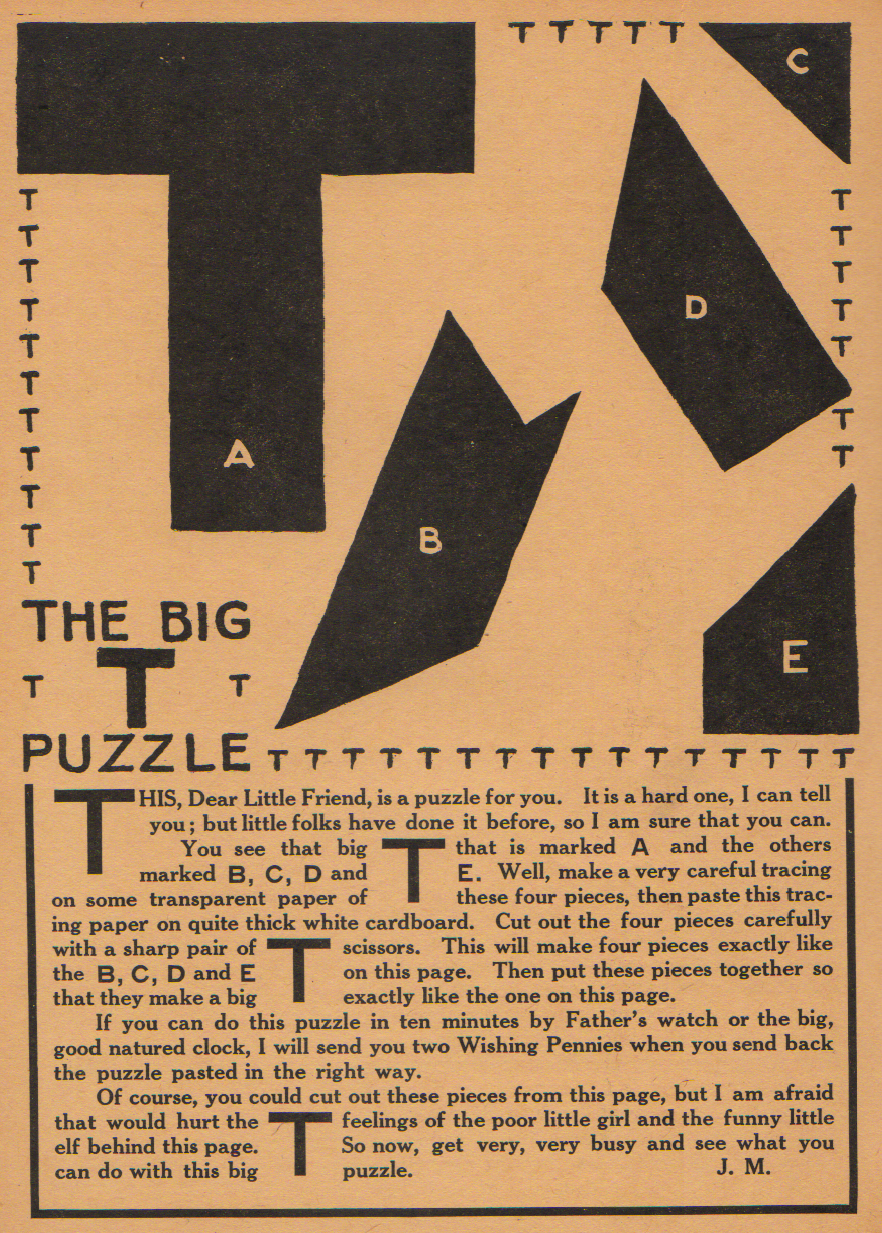
John Martin's T puzzle

Published references to the T-puzzle appeared in the beginning of the 20th century. In the October 1904 edition of "Primary Education", a monthly journal for primary teachers, the T-puzzle is described as a puzzle for tired children, and they further comment: "Putting the letter on the board will help the wee ones. They say it takes grown-ups ten minutes to fit the pieces. How long will it take the children?" Another early reference is the April 1905 edition of a magazine called "Our Young People". A particular nice presentation of the puzzle appeared in the October 1913 issue of John Martin's Book, here shown to the left.

In "Carpentry & mechanics for boys" by A. Hall (1918), figures of an example T and full-size patterns are given for the construction of a wooden version of the puzzle. The arms of the T are longer than usual. The same drawings appear in "Junior Red cross activities—teachers manual" published in the same year by the American Junior Red Cross. The puzzles presented in this book were proposed to be constructed by red cross juniors for use in the military: "to be used for distribution at canteen centers for the men passing through on the troop trains ... for use in camps, convalescent houses and hospitals" (p. 378). They note that the puzzle "has proven popular with British Tommies" (p. 394) and give detailed instructions on how to fabricate the pieces and an envelope container.

== Commercial puzzle ==
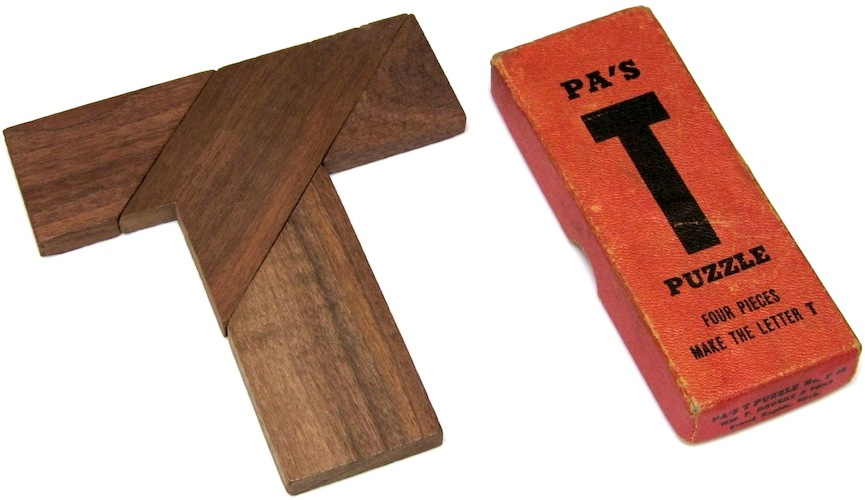
Pa's T Puzzle No. P 20 WM. F. Drueke & Sons Grand Rapids, Mich.

=== Just the T ===
The T puzzle remained popular throughout the 20th century, and versions of it were sold as a game puzzle as early as the 1920s. An example dated around that time is a French version of the puzzle called "L'ÉTÉ" produced by N.K. Atlas of Paris. Another example is the wooden version of the puzzle produced by Drueke & Sons, under the name "Pa's T puzzle", dated around the 1940s and here depicted to the right. Later, versions were produced with plastic pieces, such as "Adams T puzzle" by S.S. Adams Co in the 1950s and "The famous T puzzle" by Marx Toys in the 1960s–1970s. From the 1980s, "Mr T's puzzle" featured the actor Mr. T from the popular A-Team TV series; the back of the product packaging has the catchphrase "I pity the fool who can't solve Mr. T's puzzle".

=== Extensions ===
These 160 thematically grouped shapes can be formed with the commercially widespread asymmetric T version of the T puzzle.

It was recognized early on that other shapes could be formed with the four pieces of the T puzzle, similar to the tangram. In addition to the regular T, a 1930 advertising premium for Mohawk Rugs & Carpets features the challenge of making an arrowhead with the same pieces. In the same year a giveaway for Eberhard Faber's Van Dyke pencils featured 14 different shapes to form.

At present, T puzzles come in standardized proportions which allow the construction of many additional shapes. Some notable designs are:

- Nob's T puzzle: Designed by Nob Yoshigahara, this version of the T puzzle sold over four million copies. The pieces can be laid out in the shape of a symmetrical convex pentagon with two right angles.
- Asymmetric T: In this version, the T is asymmetric in that the left and right arm of the T have different lengths, with the shorter arm being about 83% of the longer one. All pieces have the same width and can be formed into a perfect line segment. At present, this puzzle is sold by HIQU with 100 figures to make and by Eureka Toys and Games as a product called Brain Twister.
- Gardner's T: This is the version featured in Martin Gardner's Scientific American column. The pieces also form a fatter T, as noted in a later column. This version was sold under the name "The missing T" as part of Aha! Brain teasers classics from Think Fun.
Three common variations of the T puzzle, each with different proportions of the pieces and some other shapes which can be made with the respective pieces. These other shapes are unique to each variation.

== Solving the puzzle ==
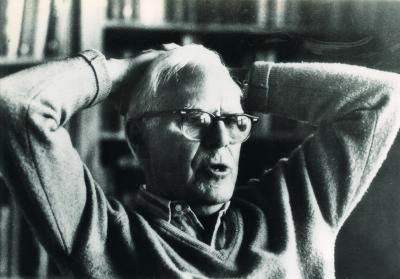
"I know of no polygon-dissection puzzle with as few pieces that is so intractable." – Martin Gardner

With only four pieces, the T puzzle is deceitfully simple. Studies have shown that few people are able solve it under five minutes, with most people needing more than half an hour to solve it. A common response of subjects is to conclude that the puzzle is impossible to solve.

The main difficulty in solving the puzzle is overcoming the functional fixedness of putting the pentagon piece either horizontally or vertically; and related to this, the tendency of trying to fill up the notch of the pentagon. In one study participants were found to spend over 60% of their attempts on such misguided placements of the pentagon piece. And even when the pentagon piece happened to be placed properly, it was mostly not recognized as part of the solution, as a match with the T is not easily seen. The puzzle is easily solved when the insight is reached that the pentagon is part of both the horizontal and vertical stem of the T and that the notch in the pentagon constitutes an inside corner.
