= Ailles rectangle =

Rectangle constructed from 4 right-angled triangles

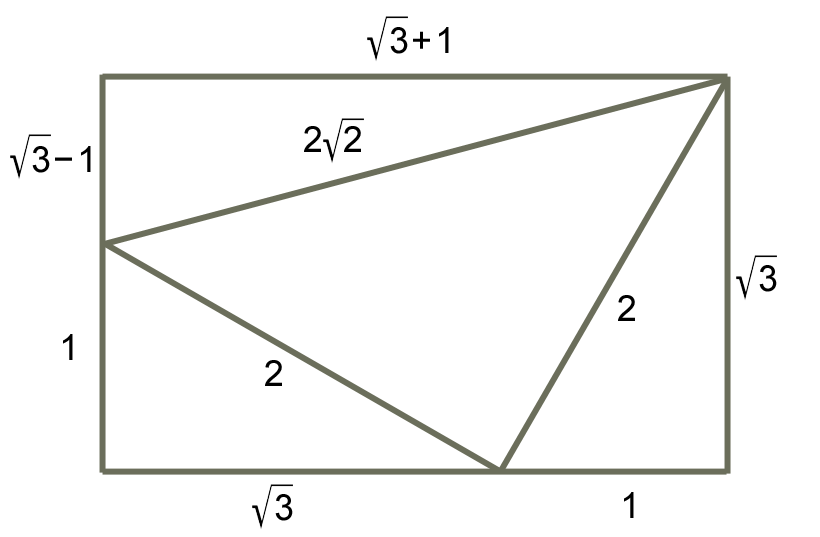
The Ailles rectangle

The Ailles rectangle is a rectangle constructed from four right-angled triangles which is commonly used in geometry classes to find the values of trigonometric functions of 15° and 75°. It is named after Douglas S. Ailles who was a high school teacher at Kipling Collegiate Institute in Toronto.

== Construction ==
A 30°–60°–90° triangle has sides of length 1, 2, and $\sqrt{3}$. When two such triangles are placed in the positions shown in the illustration, the smallest rectangle that can enclose them has width $1+\sqrt{3}$ and height $\sqrt{3}$. Drawing a line connecting the original triangles' top corners creates a 45°–45°–90° triangle between the two, with sides of lengths 2, 2, and (by the Pythagorean theorem) $2\sqrt{2}$. The remaining space at the top of the rectangle is a right triangle with acute angles of 15° and 75° and sides of $\sqrt{3}-1$, $\sqrt{3}+1$, and $2\sqrt{2}$.

== Derived trigonometric formulas ==
From the construction of the rectangle, it follows that

$$\sin 15^\circ = \cos 75^\circ = \frac{\sqrt3 - 1}{2\sqrt2} = \frac{\sqrt6 - \sqrt2} 4,$$
$$\sin 75^\circ = \cos 15^\circ = \frac{\sqrt3 + 1}{2\sqrt2} = \frac{\sqrt6 + \sqrt2} 4,$$
$$\tan 15^\circ = \cot 75^\circ = \frac{\sqrt3 - 1}{\sqrt3 + 1} = \frac{(\sqrt3 - 1)^2}{3 - 1} = 2 - \sqrt3,$$

and

$$\tan 75^\circ = \cot 15^\circ = \frac{\sqrt3 + 1}{\sqrt3 - 1} = \frac{(\sqrt3 + 1)^2}{3 - 1} = 2 + \sqrt3.$$

== Variant ==
An alternative construction (also by Ailles) places a 30°–60°–90° triangle in the middle with sidelengths of $\sqrt{2}$, $\sqrt{6}$, and $2\sqrt{2}$. Its legs are each the hypotenuse of a 45°–45°–90° triangle, one with legs of length $1$ and one with legs of length $\sqrt{3}$. The 15°–75°–90° triangle is the same as above.

== See also ==
- Exact trigonometric values
