= Trioker =

Corner-matching puzzle game

Trioker is a corner-matching puzzle game played using 25 equilateral triangle-shaped tiles. Each corner is marked with zero, one, two, or three dots and newly placed pieces must match the values on pieces already placed on the game board, similar to the gameplay of the earlier Triominoes.

== History ==
Fig.5 from New Mathematical Pastimes (MacMahon, 1921)

In the 1921 book New Mathematical Pastimes, Percy Alexander MacMahon showed there were 24 possible combinations when each of the three edges of an equilateral triangle are assigned one of four colors. In general, the number of unique pieces that can be made in this way is $\frac{n}{3}\cdot(n^2+2)$ and so for $n=4$ there are 24 unique combinations possible. MacMahon suggested an edge-matching puzzle game could be played with these pieces on a regular hexagonal board, constraining colors to match on adjacent edges and on the borders of the board itself. The similar square tiles proposed by MacMahon in the same book have since been adopted into several commercial games.

MacMahon triangular tiles (four colors)
| Triples | Doubles | | | Singles | |
| 111 | 112 | 113 | 114 | 123 | 132 |
| 222 | 223 | 224 | 221 | 234 | 243 |
| 333 | 334 | 331 [133] | 332 [233] | 341 [134] | 314 [143] |
| 444 | 441 [144] | 442 [244] | 443 [344] | 412 [124] | 421 [142] |

The notation used here for the MacMahon equilateral triangular tiles is a simple enumeration of each edge, in anti-clockwise order, starting from the bottom left edge. Rotating each tile by 120° may change this notation (e.g., after rotating the 314 tile, the revised notation would become 431 and 143 in turn) but the actual tile itself remains physically unchanged regardless of its orientation; in other words, these tiles are identical up to rotation despite the change in notation. For consistency, a notation may be adopted in which the count starts from the lowest-numbered edge, proceeding anti-clockwise; in that case, this tile would always be denoted 143. A separate signifier could be used to indicate orientation, for example, the clock hour position of the ones digit, so 143.08 = [314] and 143.04 = [431].

Rotations of [143]

143 @ 0°
("3" @ 12 o'clock)

143 @ 60° CCW
("3" @ 10)

143 @ 120° CCW
("3" @ 08)
aka [314]

143 @ 180° CCW
("3" @ 06)

143 @ 240° CCW
("3" @ 04)
aka [431]

143 @ 300° CCW
("3" @ 02)

Marc Odier developed the Trioker tiles by shifting the markings from the edges to the corners, as patented and published by Robert Laffont Games in 1969. In addition to the 24 combinations, Odier introduced a tile with a wild card value in one corner, marked by a solid square. Spirou published a supplement in 1970 (with issue 1661), providing the game pieces and a description of how to play it, followed by a regular column through the end of the year.

Trioker tiles
| Triples | Doubles | | | Singles | |
| 000 | 001 | 002 | 003 | 012 | 021 |
| 111 | 112 | 113 | 110 | 123 | 132 |
| 222 | 223 | 220 | 221 | 230 | 203 |
| 333 | 330 | 331 | 332 | 301 | 310 |

Like Triominoes, which also use equilateral triangle tiles with values marked in each corner, Trioker requires that adjacent tiles must have matching corners. However, Triominoes are marked from zero to five (or more) and have an additional marking restriction that values may not decrease when counted in a clockwise direction from the lowest value(s), so there are pieces in common between the two games, but neither game is a subset of the other.

== Gameplay ==
Additional tile with "wild card" square symbol

Le Trioker can be played either as a competitive dominoes-like game against one or more opponents, or as a puzzle game to fill a shape.

=== General ===
All variants of the game require the corners of any newly-placed tile to match the corners of adjacent tile(s) that are already on the board, consistent with the placement rule of triominoes. For the competitive variants, the winner is the first to place all their tiles on the board.

=== Original ===
Original competitive variant board (1970)

The original competitive version of the game published in 1970 used an irregular seven-sided board shaped like a truncated triangle with several marked spaces that require an additional action when a tile is played in that space:

- A5 = Pay 5 to the bank ("Payez 5 a la banque")
- B1 = Lose a turn ("Prison pour 1 tour")
- C5 = Receive 5 from the bank ("Recevez 5 de la banque")
- D2 = Receive 2 from the following player ("Recevez 2 de la suivant")
- E2 = Pay 2 to each player ("Payez 2 a chaque joueur")
- F5 = Pay 5 to the following player ("Payez 5 au suivant")

Sid Sackson's holographic notes omit the F5 space. This version uses the full 25-tile set along with red and black "coin" pieces, with the red coins worth 5 and the black coins worth 2.

=== Rapid ===
"Rapid" variant board

The rapid version of the game is intended for two, three, or four players, with each player receiving the following equipment prior to starting:

Rapid setup
| Players | Tiles | Red coins | Black coins | Remaining tiles in bank (after initial draw) |
|---|---|---|---|---|
| 2 | 10 | 5 | 5 | 5 |
| 3 | 7 | 5 | 5 | 4 |
| 4 | 6 | 4 | 5 | 1 |

The players draw from the full 25-tile set; red coins are worth 5 points and the black coins are worth 2. Each player hides their triangular tiles. The remaining tiles and coins are held for common use in the bank.

The rapid variant board is an irregular ten-sided shape, taking the form of an irregular hexagon with two indented corners; similar to the original (1970) version, certain spaces are marked with additional actions that are taken when a tile is played in them:

- A2/A5 = Pay 2 (or 5) to the bank ("Payez 2 [5] a la banque")
- B1 = Lose a turn ("Prison pour un tour")
- C2/C5 = Receive 2 (or 5) from the bank ("Prenez 2 [5] a la banque")
- E2 = Pay 2 to each player ("Payez 2 a chacun des joueurs")
- H1 = Take an additional turn immediately ("Rejouez tout de suite")
- J1 = Give one coin to the bank ("Donnez une de vos pieces a la banque")

Play starts with the player holding the triple-three ('333') tile; that player places that tile in the "GO" spot, and the next turn proceeds to the player on their left (clockwise). If the '333' tile is not held, the player holding the tile with the largest sum of pips (e.g., '332' = 8; '331' or '322' = 7; etc.) uses that tile to start instead.

The next player must play a tile from their hand that can be placed legally adjacent to the starting tile. If a player does not have a tile that can be placed legally, they must draw one of the remaining tiles from the bank, then either play the drawn tile or pass their turn. When there are no free tiles left in the bank, players must pass instead.

==== Scoring ====
After one player empties their hand, that player receives ten points from the bank, while the other players must pay the bank two points plus the sum of the pips on each tile. For example, a player with the '000' tile will pay a total of two points to the bank for that tile, while a player with the '230' tile will pay a total of seven points to the bank (2+[2+3+0]). Because of this, it is advantageous to use higher-value tiles early in the game. The overall winner is the player with the most points.

The game also may end in a draw if no player is able to empty their hand. In that case, the game should be replayed with a fresh draw.

=== Even-Odd ===
"Even-Odd" variant board

The even-odd version is an advanced variant intended for two players that uses a 24-tile subset, omitting the "joker" piece. One player takes the 12 "even" pieces, while the other player takes the 12 "odd" pieces. Throughout the game, each player's pieces are kept face-up so the opposing player knows which pieces are remaining. Comic characters from Spirou were assigned to each piece in the version of the game reprinted in that magazine.

Pair-Impair setup
| | Pair (Even) | | Impair (Odd) | |
| Triples | | | | |
| Triples | 000 Bobo | 222 Kroston | 111 Sibylline | 333 Schtroumpf |
| Doubles | | | | |
| Doubles | 001 Marc Lebut | 002 Foufi | 003 Sophie | |
| Doubles | 110 Sandy | | 112 Vieux Nick | 113 Oncle Paul |
| Doubles | 220 Patate | 223 Benoît Brisefer | 221 Timour | |
| Doubles | 332 Gil Jourdan | | 330 César | 331 Attila |
| Singles | | | | |
| Singles | 012 Tif | 132 Bill | 021 Tondu | 123 Boule |
| Singles | 230 Johan | 310 Fantasio | 203 Pirlouit | 301 Spirou |

The board has 73 triangular cells arranged in an irregular hexagon. Advanced players may choose to reduce this to a 52-cell board by mutual agreement to avoid the shaded cells, which increases the difficulty.

One of the two players flips a coin, which determines whether they will play the "even" (by flipping tails) or "odd" (heads) side. The even player places the first piece in the center of the board; they may choose any piece they hold, aside from the two triples ('000' or '222'), as that would unfairly limit the opening move for the odd player. The players take turns placing tiles adjacent to placed tiles, observing the corner-matching rules.

When a player completes a hexagon by adding a sixth tile using a legal placement, that player takes another turn immediately. This also applies if two hexagons are completed by a single tile, in which case that player is awarded two more turns.

A player may choose to block their opponent by making it impossible to place one of their remaining pieces legally, which is facilitated by both players keeping the pieces face-up. If there are no legal moves for a player, that player is forced to pass their turn. However, if a player passes and their opponent notices they have a legal move available, the passing player is obligated to place that tile.

The winner is the first player to place their last tile. If there are no legal moves for both players, the winner is the player with fewer tiles remaining; if both players have the same number of tiles, the game is a draw and should be replayed, switching the even and odd roles.

=== Simple ===
In Surprenants triangles (1976), Odier proposes several simple game variants, including single, double, and triple linear paths starting from the triple-three tile.

=== Puzzles ===
The puzzle variant is intended for solo players to fill a shape while observing corner-matching rules for adjacent tiles. There are many possible shapes, and at least one book has been published with additional shapes beyond those contained in the rulebook.
