= Polydrafter =

Geometric shape formed of right triangles

30–60–90 triangle

In recreational mathematics, a polydrafter is a polyform with a 30°–60°–90° right triangle as the base form. This triangle is also called a drafting triangle, hence the name. This triangle is also half of an equilateral triangle, and a polydrafter's cells must consist of halves of triangles in the triangular tiling of the plane; consequently, when two drafters share an edge that is the middle of their three edge lengths, they must be reflections rather than rotations of each other. Any contiguous subset of halves of triangles in this tiling is allowed, so unlike most polyforms, a polydrafter may have cells joined along unequal edges: a hypotenuse and a short leg.

== History ==
Polydrafters were invented by Christopher Monckton, who used the name polydudes for polydrafters that have no cells attached only by the length of a short leg. Monckton's Eternity Puzzle was composed of 209 12-dudes.

The term polydrafter was coined by Ed Pegg Jr., who also proposed as a puzzle the task of fitting the 14 tridrafters—all possible clusters of three drafters—into a trapezoid whose sides are 2, 3, 5, and 3 times the length of the hypotenuse of a drafter.

== Extended polydrafters ==
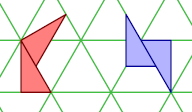
Two extended didrafters

An extended polydrafter is a variant in which the drafter cells cannot all conform to the triangle (polyiamond) grid. The cells are still joined at short legs, long legs, hypotenuses and half-hypotenuses. See the Logelium link below.

== Enumerating polydrafters ==
Like polyominoes, polydrafters can be enumerated in two ways, depending on whether chiral pairs of polydrafters are counted as one polydrafter or two.

n	Name of n-polydrafter	Number of n-polydrafters (reflections counted separately)		Number of free n-polydudes
n	Name of n-polydrafter	free (sequence A056842 in the OEIS)	one-sided (sequence A217720 in the OEIS)	Number of free n-polydudes
1	monodrafter	1	2	1
2	didrafter	6	8	3
3	tridrafter	14	28	1
4	tetradrafter	64	116	9
5	pentadrafter	237	474	15
6	hexadrafter	1024	2001	59

With two or more cells, the numbers are greater if extended polydrafters are included. For example, the number of didrafters rises from 6 to 13. See (sequence A289137 in the OEIS).

== See also ==
- The kisrhombille tiling, a tessellation of the plane made of 30°–60°–90° triangles.
