= William Sunners =

American Writer

William Sunners (1904–1988) was an American writer. He wrote over 100 books on how to win prizes in contests.

In the 1930s and 1940s he won several prizes in puzzle contests, including three automobiles. In 1949 he published a best-selling book titled How to Win Prize Contests, which sold over 100,000 copies in 8 years.

Sunners was an occasional contributor to Word Ways: The Journal of Recreational Linguistics.

Sunners had a 1983 appearance on Late Night With David Letterman.
