= Tiling puzzle =

Puzzles involving the assembly of flat shapes

Example of a tiling puzzle that utilizes negative space.

Tiling puzzles are puzzles involving two-dimensional packing problems in which a number of flat shapes have to be assembled into a larger given shape without overlaps (and often without gaps). Some tiling puzzles ask players to dissect a given shape first and then rearrange the pieces into another shape. Other tiling puzzles ask players to dissect a given shape while fulfilling certain conditions. The two latter types of tiling puzzles are also called dissection puzzles.

Tiling puzzles may be made from wood, metal, cardboard, plastic or any other sheet-material. Many tiling puzzles are now available as computer games.

Tiling puzzles have a long history. Some of the oldest and most famous are jigsaw puzzles and the tangram puzzle.

Other examples of tiling puzzles include:

- Toy block
- Conway puzzle
- Domino tiling, of which the mutilated chessboard problem is one example
- Eternity puzzle
- Geometric magic square
- Puzz-3D
- Squaring the square
- Tantrix
- T puzzle

Many three-dimensional mechanical puzzles can be regarded as three-dimensional tiling puzzles.

== See also ==
- Dissection puzzle
- Edge-matching puzzle
- Polyforms
- Sliding puzzle
- Tessellation
