= Special right triangle =

Right triangle with a feature making calculations on the triangle easier

Position of some special triangles in an Euler diagram of types of triangles, using the definition that isosceles triangles have at least two equal sides, i.e. that equilateral triangles are isosceles

A special right triangle is a right triangle with some notable feature that makes calculations on the triangle easier, or for which simple formulas exist.

The various relationships between the angles and sides of such triangles allow one to quickly calculate some useful quantities in geometric problems without resorting to more advanced methods.

== Angle-based ==
Special angle-based triangles inscribed in a unit circle are handy for visualizing and remembering trigonometric functions of multiples of 30 and 45 degrees.

Angle-based special right triangles are those involving some special relationship between the triangle's three angle measures. The angles of these triangles are such that the larger (right) angle, which is 90 degrees or π/2 radians, is equal to the sum of the other two angles.

The side lengths of these triangles can be deduced based on the unit circle, or with the use of other geometric methods; and these approaches may be extended to produce the values of trigonometric functions for some common angles, shown in the table below.

degrees	radians	gons	turns	sin	cos	tan	cotan
0°	0	0^{g}	0	√0/2 = 0	√4/2 = 1	0	undefined
30°	π/6	33 1/3^{g}	1/12	√1/2 = 1/2	√3/2	1/√3	√3
45°	π/4	50^{g}	1/8	√2/2 = 1/√2	√2/2 = 1/√2	1	1
60°	π/3	66 2/3^{g}	1/6	√3/2	√1/2 = 1/2	√3	1/√3
90°	π/2	100^{g}	1/4	√4/2 = 1	√0/2 = 0	undefined	0

45°–45°–90°

30°–60°–90°

The 45°–45°–90° triangle, the 30°–60°–90° triangle, and the equilateral/equiangular (60°–60°–60°) triangle are the three Möbius triangles in the plane, meaning that they tessellate the plane via reflections in their sides; see Triangle group.

=== 45°–45°–90° triangle ===
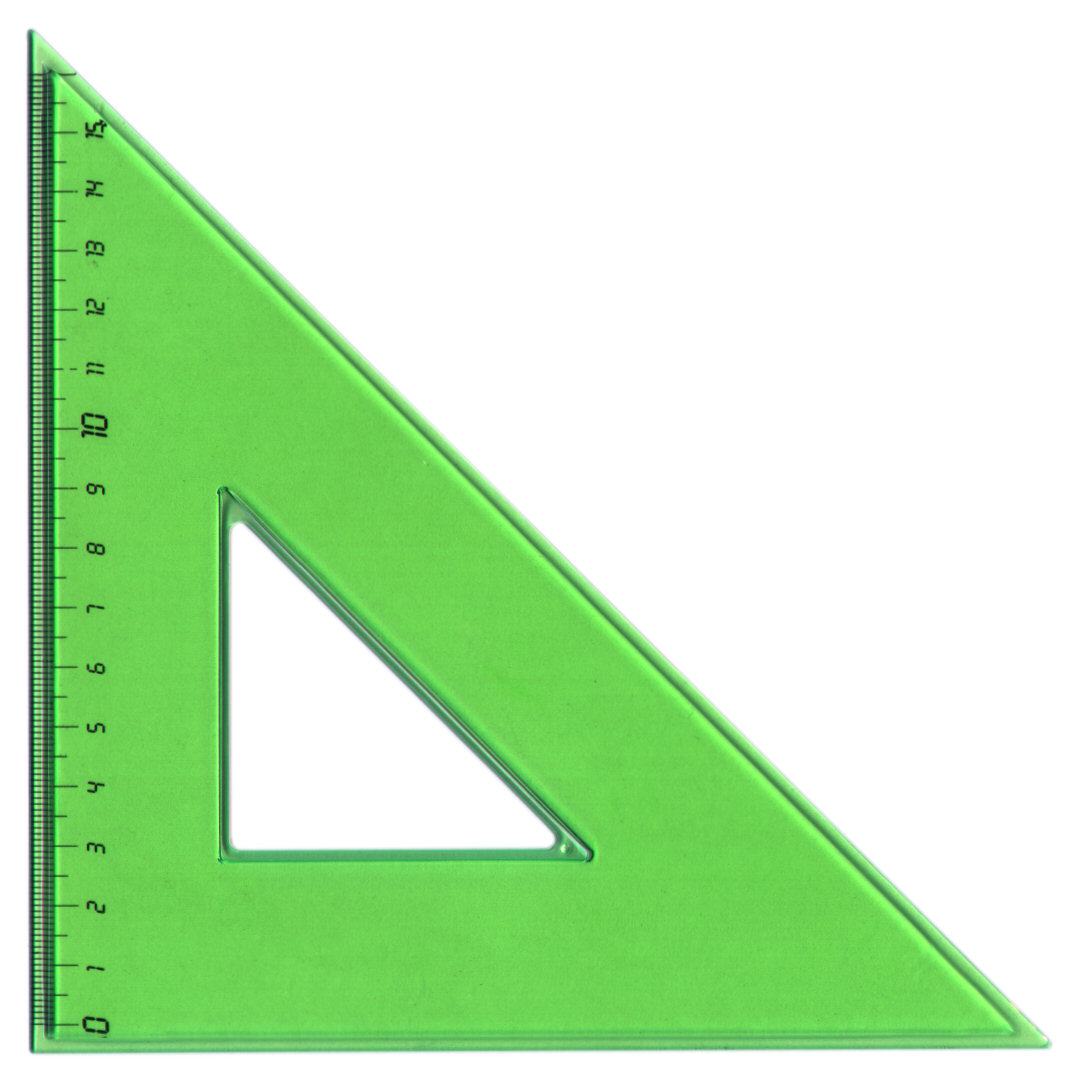
Set square shaped as 45°–45°–90° triangle

The side lengths of a 45°–45°–90° triangle

45°–45°–90° right triangle of hypotenuse length 1

In plane geometry, dividing a square along its diagonal results in two isosceles right triangles, each with one right angle (90°, π/2 radians) and two other congruent angles each measuring half of a right angle (45°, or π/4 radians). The sides in this triangle are in the ratio 1 : 1 : √2, which follows immediately from the Pythagorean theorem.

Of all right triangles, such 45°–45°–90° degree triangles have the smallest ratio of the hypotenuse to the sum of the legs, namely √2/2. and the greatest ratio of the altitude from the hypotenuse to the sum of the legs, namely √2/4.

Triangles with these angles are the only possible right triangles that are also isosceles triangles in Euclidean geometry. However, in spherical geometry and hyperbolic geometry, there are infinitely many different shapes of right isosceles triangles.

=== 30°–60°–90° triangle ===
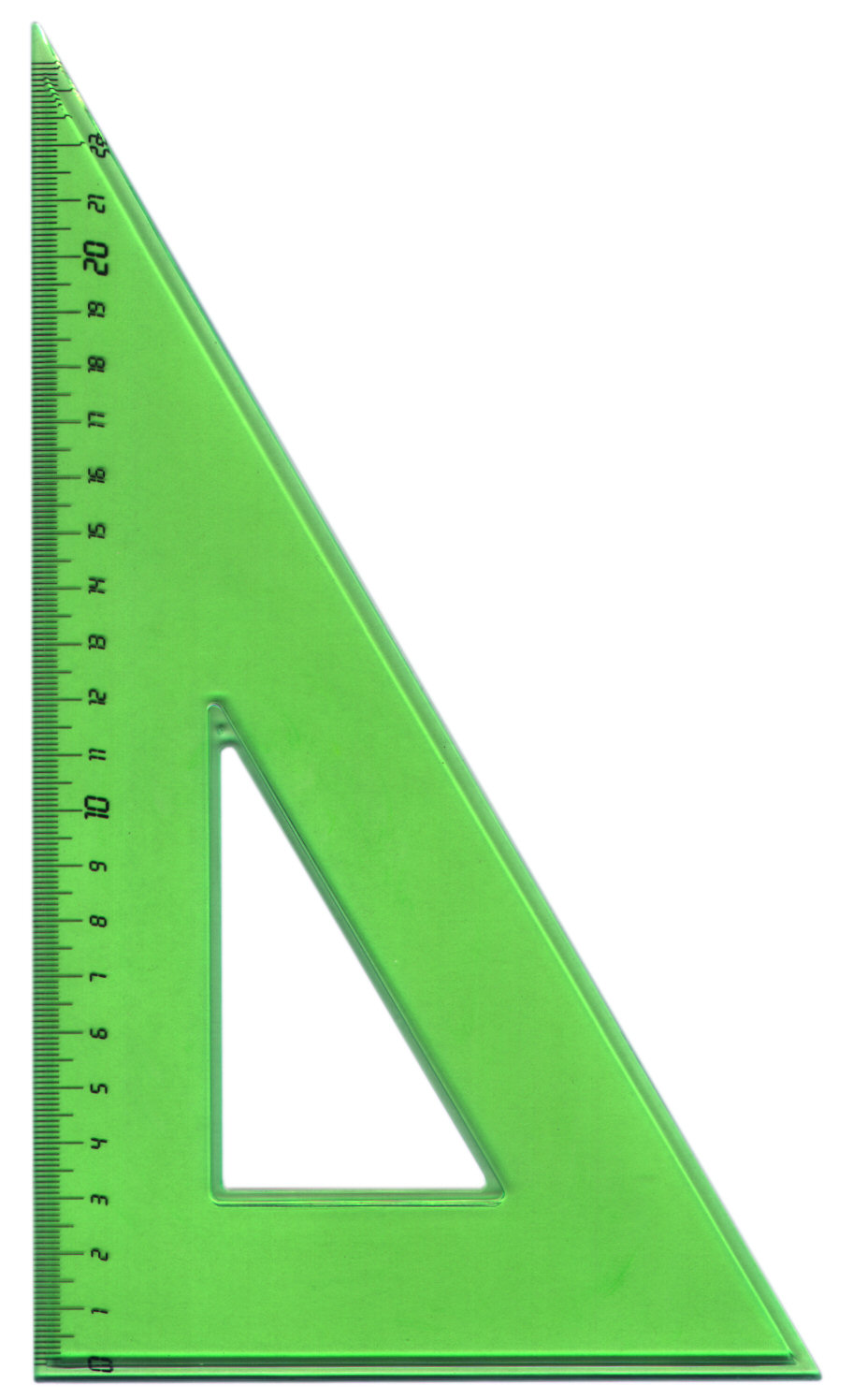
Set square, shaped as 30°–60°–90° triangle

The side lengths of a 30°–60°–90° triangle

30°–60°–90° right triangle of hypotenuse length 1

Another type of special right triangle is the 30°-60°-90° triangle, which refers to any triangle with those three angle measures. Notably, these angles are in the ratio 1 : 2 : 3. The alternate name drafter, as in polydrafter, comes from usage as a set square drafting triangle.

A useful property of such triangles is that their side lengths are in the ratio 1 : √3 : 2. This property can be proven using trigonometry, or via the geometric proof below:

Draw an equilateral triangle ABC with side length 2, and with point M as the midpoint of segment BC. Draw an altitude line from A to M. Then ABM is a 30°–60°–90° triangle with hypotenuse of length 2, and base BM of length 1.

The fact that the remaining leg AM has length √3 follows immediately from the Pythagorean theorem.

The 30°–60°–90° triangle is the only right triangle whose angles are in an arithmetic progression. The proof of this fact is simple and follows on from the fact that if α, α + δ, α + 2δ are the angles in the progression then the sum of the angles 3α + 3δ = 180°. After dividing by 3, the angle α + δ must be 60°. The right angle is 90°, leaving the remaining angle to be 30°.

== Side-based ==
Right triangles whose sides are of integer lengths, with the sides collectively known as Pythagorean triples, possess angles that cannot all be rational numbers of degrees. (This follows from Niven's theorem.) They are most useful in that they may be easily remembered and any multiple of the sides produces the same relationship. Using Euclid's formula for generating Pythagorean triples, the sides must be in the ratio

m^{2} − n^{2} : 2mn : m^{2} + n^{2}

where m and n are any positive integers such that m > n.

=== Common Pythagorean triples ===
There are several Pythagorean triples which are well-known, including those with sides in the ratios:

3 :	4 :	5
5 :	12 :	13
8 :	15 :	17
7 :	24 :	25
9 :	40 :	41

The 3 : 4 : 5 triangles are the only right triangles with edges in arithmetic progression. Triangles based on Pythagorean triples are Heronian, meaning they have integer area as well as integer sides.

The possible use of the 3 : 4 : 5 triangle in Ancient Egypt, with the supposed use of a knotted rope to lay out such a triangle, and the question whether Pythagoras' theorem was known at that time, have been much debated. It was first conjectured by the historian Moritz Cantor in 1882. It is known that right angles were laid out accurately in Ancient Egypt; that their surveyors did use ropes for measurement; that Plutarch recorded in Isis and Osiris (around 100 AD) that the Egyptians admired the 3 : 4 : 5 triangle; and that the Berlin Papyrus 6619 from the Middle Kingdom of Egypt (before 1700 BC) stated that "the area of a square of 100 is equal to that of two smaller squares. The side of one is 1/2 + 1/4 the side of the other." The historian of mathematics Roger L. Cooke observes that "It is hard to imagine anyone being interested in such conditions without knowing the Pythagorean theorem." Against this, Cooke notes that no Egyptian text before 300 BC actually mentions the use of the theorem to find the length of a triangle's sides, and that there are simpler ways to construct a right angle. Cooke concludes that Cantor's conjecture remains uncertain: he guesses that the Ancient Egyptians probably did know the Pythagorean theorem, but that "there is no evidence that they used it to construct right angles".

The following are all the Pythagorean triple ratios expressed in lowest form (beyond the five smallest ones in lowest form in the list above) with both non-hypotenuse sides less than 256:

11 :	60 :	61
12 :	35 :	37
13 :	84 :	85
15 :	112 :	113
16 :	63 :	65
17 :	144 :	145
19 :	180 :	181
20 :	21 :	29
20 :	99 :	101
21 :	220 :	:221

24 :	143 :	145
28 :	45 :	53
28 :	195 :	197
32 :	255 :	257
33 :	56 :	65
36 :	77 :	85
39 :	80 :	89
44 :	117 :	125
48 :	55 :	73
51 :	140 :	149

52 :	165 :	173
57 :	176 :	185
60 :	91 :	109
60 :	221 :	229
65 :	72 :	97
84 :	187 :	205
85 :	132 :	157
88 :	105 :	137
95 :	168 :	193
96 :	247 :	265

104 :	153 :	185
105 :	208 :	233
115 :	252 :	277
119 :	120 :	169
120 :	209 :	241
133 :	156 :	205
140 :	171 :	221
160 :	231 :	281
161 :	240 :	289
204 :	253 :	325
207 :	224 :	305

=== Almost-isosceles Pythagorean triples ===
Isosceles right-angled triangles cannot have sides with integer values, because the ratio of the hypotenuse to either other side is √2 and √2 cannot be expressed as a ratio of two integers. However, infinitely many almost-isosceles right triangles do exist. These are right-angled triangles with integer sides for which the lengths of the non-hypotenuse edges differ by one. Such almost-isosceles right-angled triangles can be obtained recursively,

a_{0} = 1, b_{0} = 2
a_{n} = 2b_{n−1} + a_{n−1}
b_{n} = 2a_{n} + b_{n−1}

a_{n} is length of hypotenuse, n = 1, 2, 3, .... Equivalently,

$$(\tfrac{x-1}{2})^2+(\tfrac{x+1}{2})^2 = y^2$$

where {x, y} are solutions to the Pell equation x^{2} − 2y^{2} = −1, with the hypotenuse y being the odd terms of the Pell numbers 1, 2, 5, 12, 29, 70, 169, 408, 985, 2378... (sequence A000129 in the OEIS).. The smallest Pythagorean triples resulting are:

3 :	4 :	5
20 :	21 :	29
119 :	120 :	169
696 :	697 :	985

4,059 :	4,060 :	5,741
23,660 :	23,661 :	33,461
137,903 :	137,904 :	195,025
803,760 :	803,761 :	1,136,689

Alternatively, the same triangles can be derived from the square triangular numbers.

=== Arithmetic and geometric progressions ===
A Kepler triangle is a right triangle formed by three squares with areas in geometric progression according to the golden ratio.

The Kepler triangle is a right triangle whose sides are in geometric progression. If the sides are formed from the geometric progression a, ar, ar^{2} then its common ratio r is given by r = √φ where φ is the golden ratio. Its sides are therefore in the ratio 1 : √φ : φ. Thus, the shape of the Kepler triangle is uniquely determined (up to a scale factor) by the requirement that its sides be in geometric progression.

The 3–4–5 triangle is the unique right triangle (up to scaling) whose sides are in arithmetic progression.

=== Sides of regular polygons ===
The sides of a pentagon, hexagon, and decagon, inscribed in congruent circles, form a right triangle.

Let
$$a=2\sin\frac{\pi}{10}=\frac{-1+\sqrt5}{2}=\frac1\varphi\approx 0.618$$
be the side length of a regular decagon inscribed in the unit circle, where $\varphi$ is the golden ratio. Let
$$b=2\sin\frac{\pi}{6}=1$$
be the side length of a regular hexagon in the unit circle, and let
$$c=2\sin\frac{\pi}{5}=\sqrt{\frac{5-\sqrt5}{2}}\approx 1.176$$
be the side length of a regular pentagon in the unit circle. Then $a^2+b^2=c^2$, so these three lengths form the sides of a right triangle. The same triangle forms half of a golden rectangle. It may also be found within a regular icosahedron of side length $c$: the shortest line segment from any vertex $V$ to the plane of its five neighbors has length $a$, and the endpoints of this line segment together with any of the neighbors of $V$ form the vertices of a right triangle with sides $a$, $b$, and $c$.

== See also ==
- Ailles rectangle, combining several special right triangles
- Integer triangle
- Spiral of Theodorus
