= The Oyster Meal =

Painting by Jacob Ochtervelt

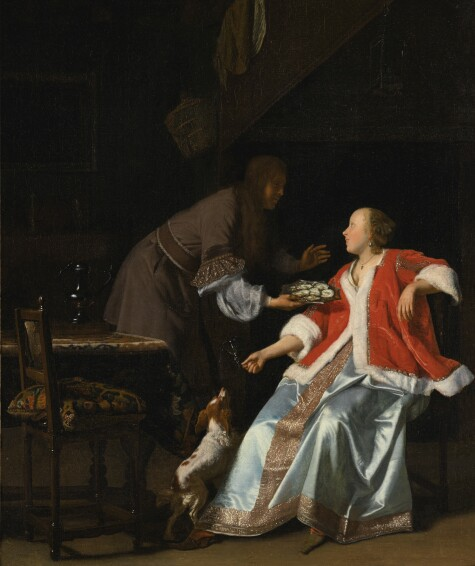
Jacob Ochtervelt, The Oyster Meal, 1664–65. 21 in × 17.5 in (53 cm × 44 cm)

The Oyster Meal is an oil on canvas genre painting by the Dutch Golden Age artist Jacob Ochtervelt, dated to around 1664–65. It depicts a man offering a plate of oysters to a woman he is trying to seduce.

The painting was stolen from a bank vault in the Netherlands in 1945, and identified as Nazi plunder while held by the City of London Corporation in 2017. After its return to the descendants of its former owners, it was sold by Sotheby's in 2018 for £1.6m, with the auction catalogue describing it as "one of Ochtervelt's finest surviving works".

== Description ==
The painting measures 21 in × 17.5 in (53 cm × 44 cm). Its subject is usually interpreted as a seduction scene, charged with erotic meaning: a solicitous young man is offering a plate of oysters – an aphrodisiac and symbol of sexual pleasure – to a smiling young woman. Both are wearing fine clothes: the man has elaborate silver embroidery on the cuffs of his coat; and the woman wears a light blue silk gown with jacket of scarlet velvet trimmed with white fur. She may be a well-dressed courtesan, with her unmade bed in the shadowed background. Incidental details suggest something is awry.

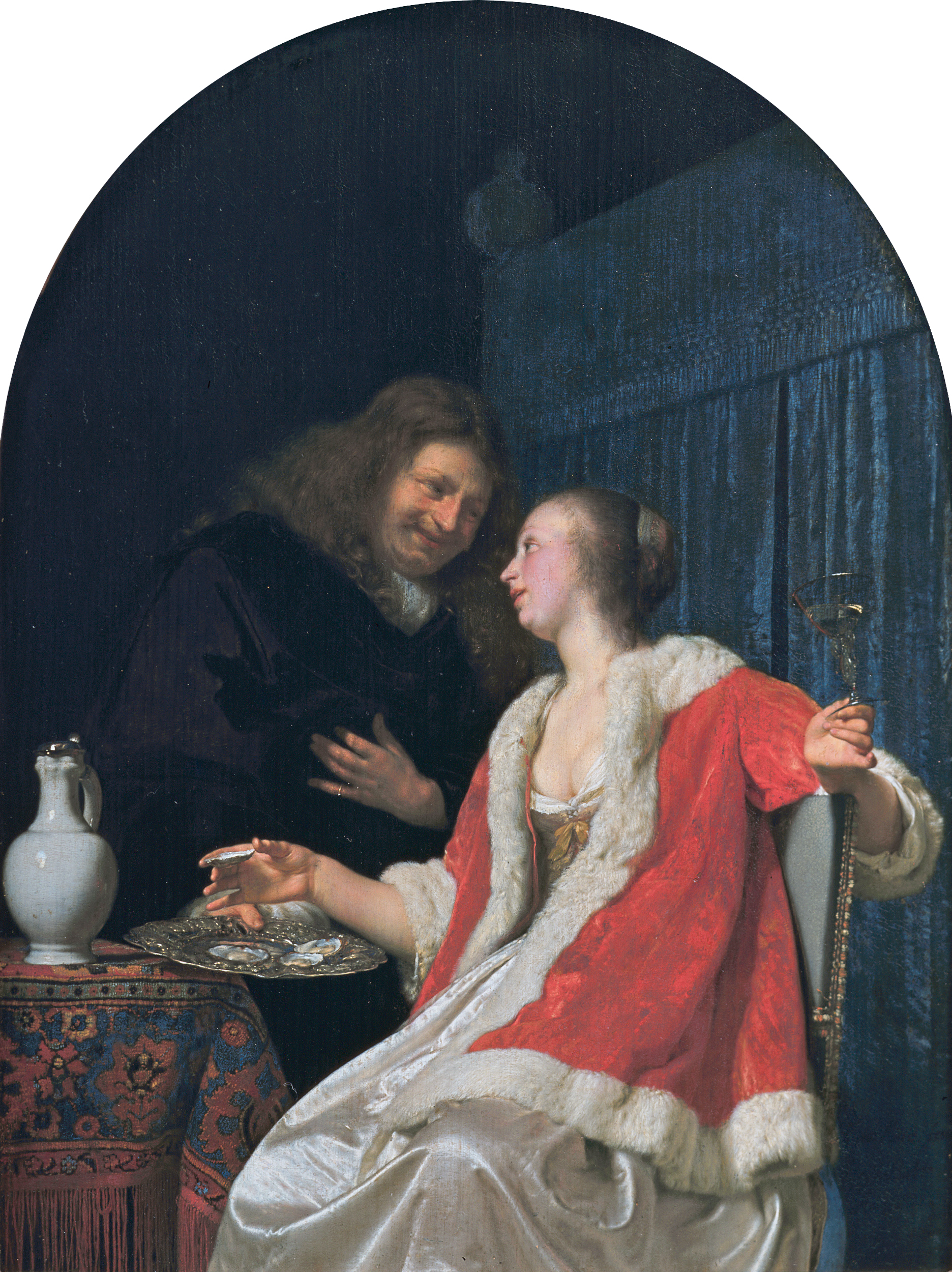
A similar painting by Frans van Mieris the Elder, The Oyster Meal, 1661, Mauritshuis

She is distractedly spilling drops from her glass of wine held precariously between her right finger and thumb: the drops are falling towards a spaniel waiting to drink; a bird cage hangs empty, the bird has flown; and a distressed chair in the foreground has a knob missing on one side, with some fraying upholstery coming unstitched. There is a pewter jug on the table. The details allow Ochtervelt to show his mastery of the effects of light falling on pewter, glass, fur and textiles.

The subject of an oyster meal was painted by other Dutch artists, including Jan Steen, Frans van Mieris the Elder, and Gabriel Metsu. Jacob Ochtervelt painted other versions of the same subject, including an example of 1663-35 held by the Thyssen-Bornemisza Museum in Madrid, and another of 1667 held by the Museum Boijmans Van Beuningen in Rotterdam.

== Provenance ==
The work was owned by Charles de Morny, Duke of Morny in Paris, and then sold at the Hôtel Drouot in 1874 for 6,000 Francs. It was owned by Henry Louis Bischoffsheim in London, and sold after his death to Alphons Preyer, and then to Frederik Muller. It passed through the hands of the Galerie van Diemen, and J. Teixeira de Mattos, and then the firm of the art dealer Daniël Katz in Dieren.

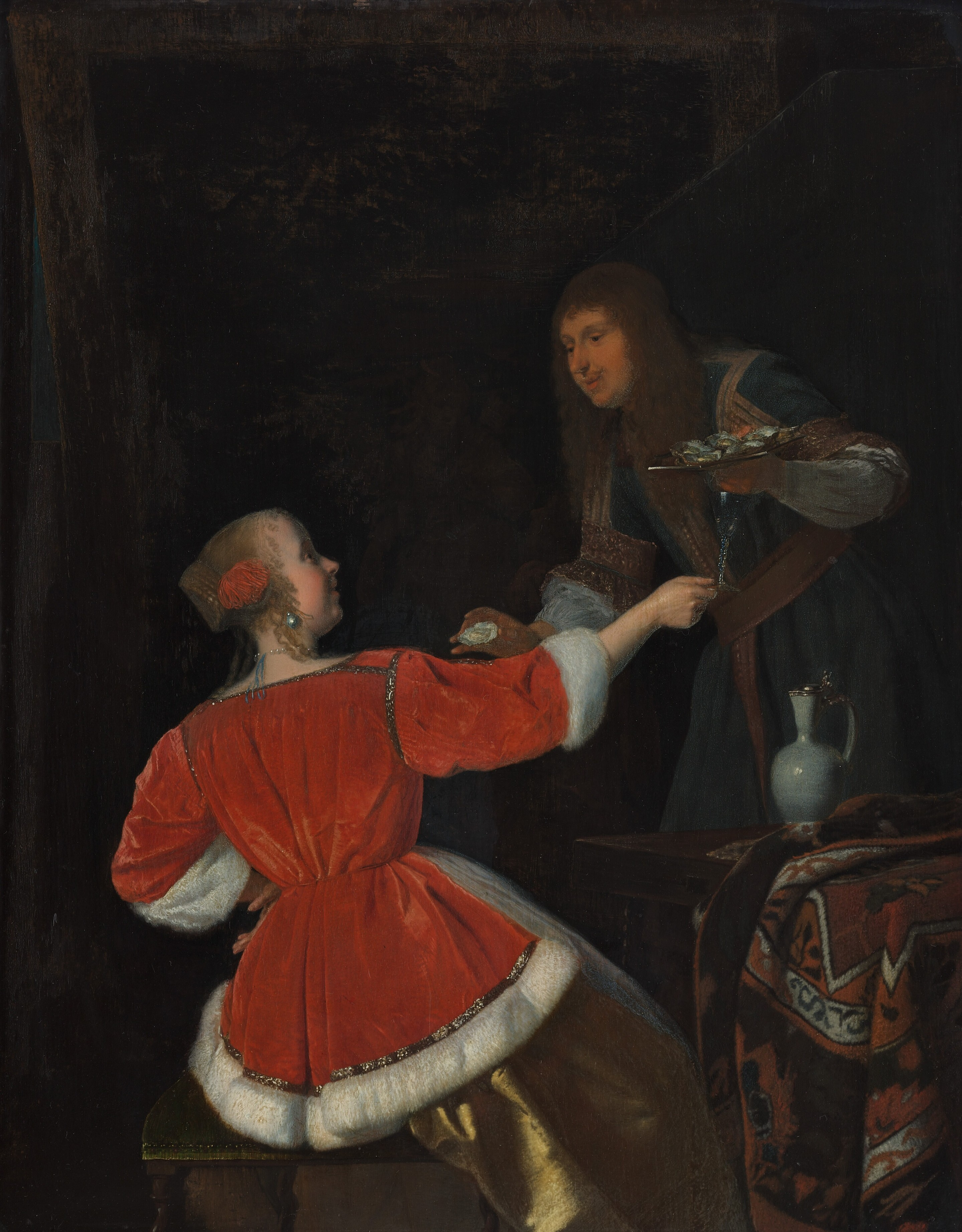
Jacob Ochtervelt, The Oyster Meal, 1667, Museum Boijmans Van Beuningen

It was acquired in 1936 by the Dutch paediatrician J. H. Smidt van Gelder, who was the director of the children’s hospital (Kinderziekenhuis) in Arnhem. After the Netherlands was invaded in 1940 by Nazi Germany, Smidt van Gelder secured his collection of 25 paintings in the vault of the Arnhem branch of the Amsterdamsche Bank (now part of ABN AMRO). Smidt van Gelder helped the Dutch resistance: he escaped imminent arrest and was forced into hiding in 1943, with his house confiscated. Arnhem was forcibly cleared of its population and looted by the occupying German forces in the aftermath of the Operation Market Garden in September 1944, and the painting was one of 14 of Smidt van Gelder's artworks stolen from the bank vault in January 1945 by looters from Gaukommando Düsseldorf led by Helmut Temmler. Most of Smidt van Gelder's painting were recovered after the war, but six including The Oyster Meal were not found.

Later researchers uncovered most of the post-war history of the painting. After passing through art dealers in Düsseldorf, including Galerie Peiffer, the painting reappeared at Galerie Kurt Meissner in Zurich in 1965 without a provenance.

It as bought by J. William Middendorf II, and held in Washington DC before it came into the possession of the art dealer Edward Speelman, who sold it in 1971 to the property developer and entrepreneur Harold Samuel. It was transferred to the City of London Corporation in 1987, as part of the collection of 84 artworks bequeathed to the corporation by Samuel, with the condition that the whole collection should be retained permanently at the Mansion House, London. Years later, the artwork was identified as looted art by the Commission for Looted Art in Europe. Samuel's heirs waived the condition of the bequest, and the painting was returned to his daughter Charlotte Bischoff van Heemskerck, then aged 96, in 2017 (as Smidt van Gelder himself had died in 1969).

The painting was sold at Sotheby's in London in July 2018 for a hammer price of £1.6m (or £1.93m including the buyer's premium). It was the second highest price paid for a work by Ochtervelt, after the $4.42m (£2.68m) paid at Sotheby's in New York in January 2014 for a painting of a child and nurse, now held by the National Gallery of Art in Washington, DC. The proceeds of sale were divided among the 20 heirs of Smidt van Gelder.

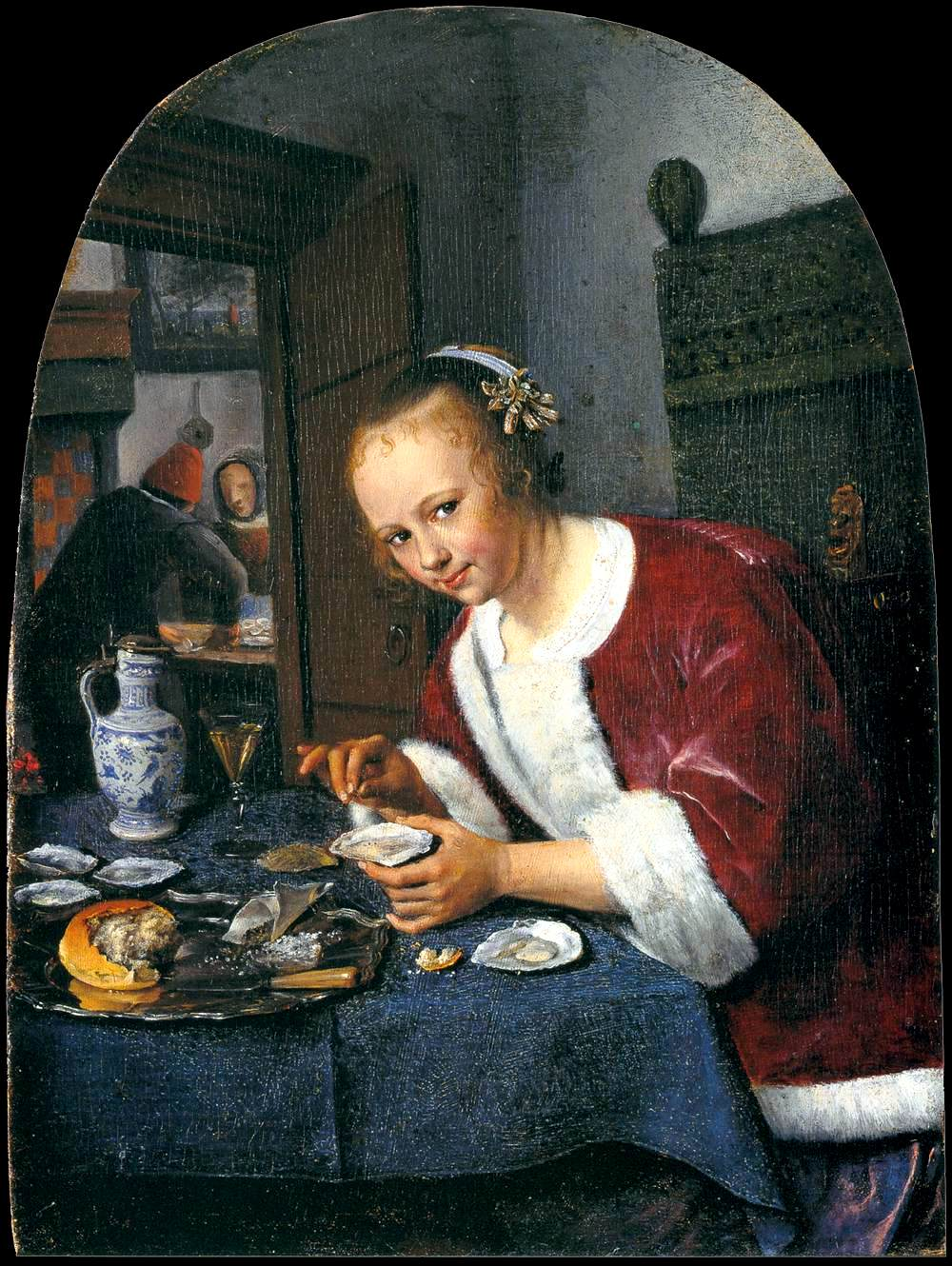
Jan Steen, The Oyster Eater, 1658–1660, Mauritshuis

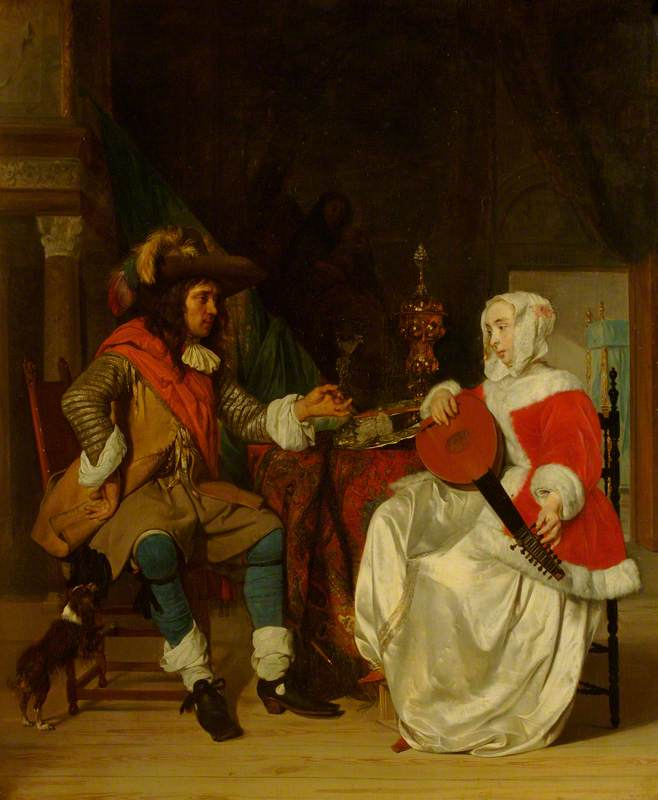
Gabriel Metsu, The Tête-à-Tête: A Lady Playing a Lute, and a Cavalier (with oysters on the table), 1662–1665, Waddesdon Manor

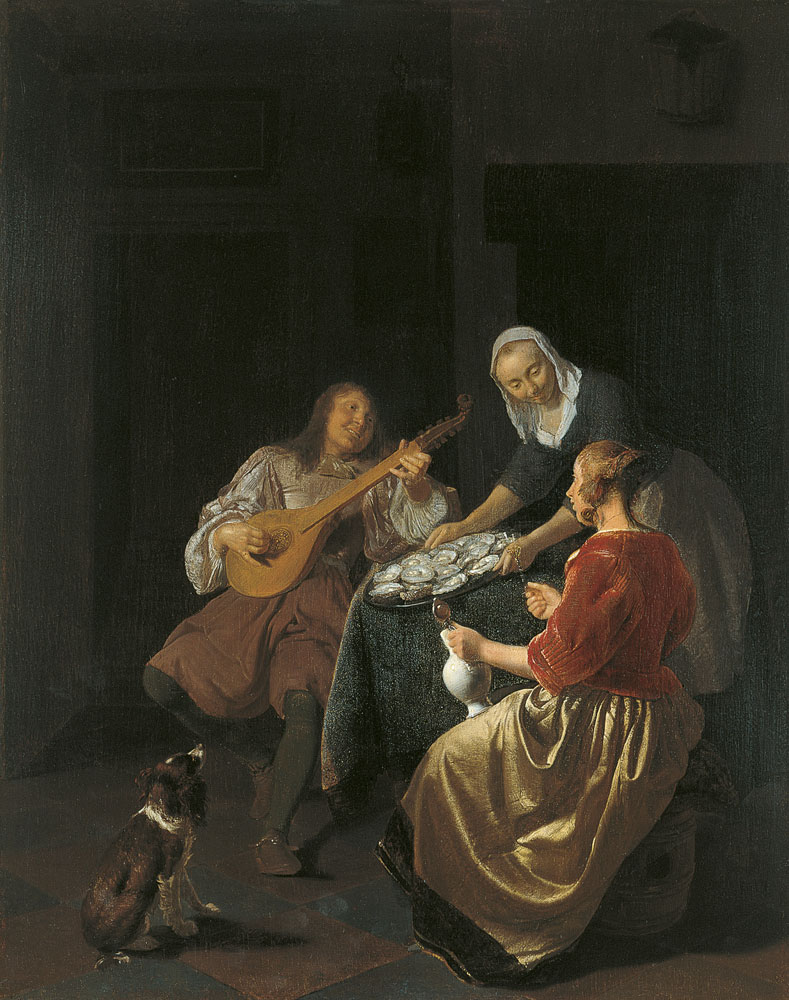
Jacob Ochtervelt, Oyster Eaters, c.1665-1669, Thyssen-Bornemisza Museum
