= Dissection (disambiguation) =

Dissection is the dismembering of the body of a deceased animal or plant to study its anatomical structure.

Dissection may also refer to:

- dissection problem in geometry - Partitioning a geometric figure into smaller pieces that are rearranged into a new figure of equal content.
  - hinged dissection - A kind of geometric dissection in which all of the pieces are connected into a chain by "hinged" points.
- Dissection into orthoschemes in geometry - An unsolved conjecture that every simplex can be dissected into orthoschemes.
- Dissection puzzle - A tiling puzzle, assembling a set of pieces to produce two or more distinct geometric shapes.
- Dissection (medical), a tear in a blood vessel
- Dissection (band), a Swedish extreme metal band
- Dissection (album), a 1997 Crimson Thorn album
- Dissected plateau, a plateau area
- Dissect (podcast), a music podcast
- Dissection (volcanology), a process of erosion exposing the inner structure of a volcano
