= J. H. Smidt van Gelder =

Owner art looted by Nazis

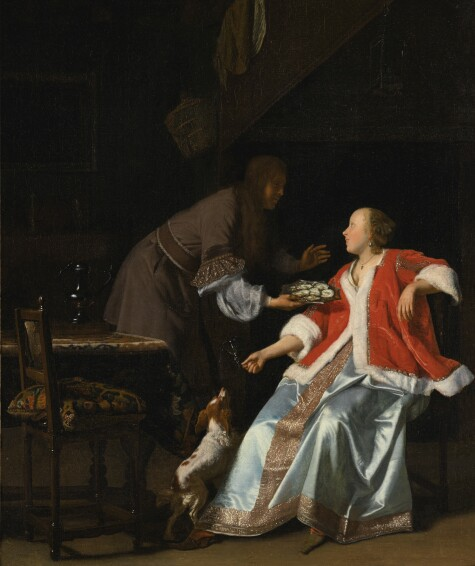
Jacob Ochtervelt, The Oyster Meal, oil on canvas, c.1664-1645.

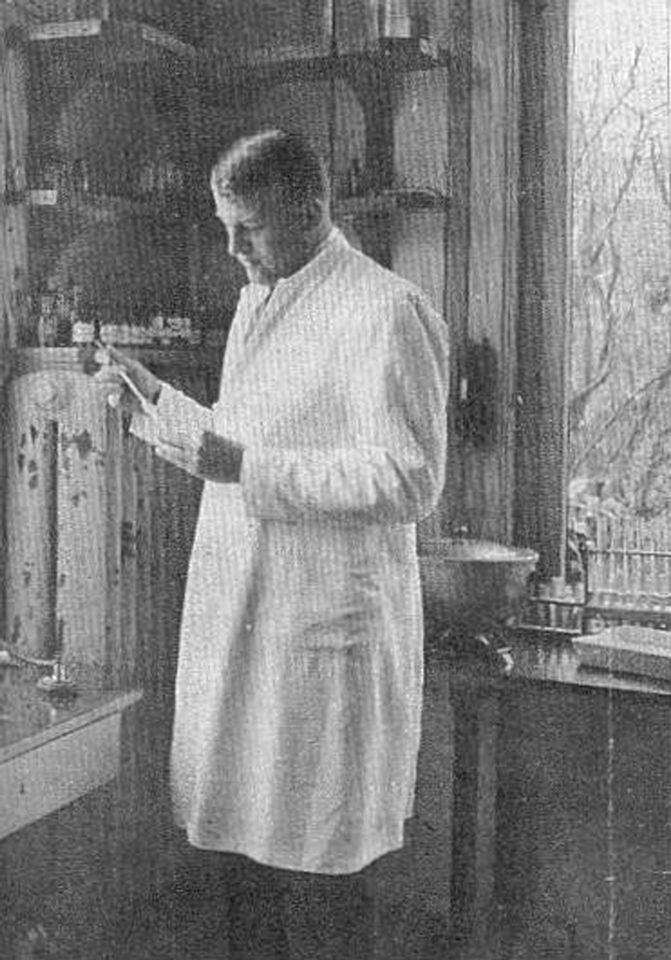
Dr Smidt van Gelder in his laboratory in the Children's Hospital Arnhem

Joan Hendrik Smidt van Gelder (6 April 1887, Amsterdam - 3 June 1969, Rheden) was the director of the children's hospital in Arnhem, the Netherlands. He was the son of Van Gelder Zonen paper manufacturer Pieter Smidt van Gelder (1851-1934) owner of van de Vereenigde Koninklijke Papierfabrieken der firma Van Gelder Zonen, and Maria Cornelia Kaars Sijpesteijn. Joan Smidt van Gelder Studied Medicine at Rijks Universiteit Leiden, and lived at Breestraat 144, in Leiden. After an arrest warrant was issued by the German occupied forces for his arrest, his home at the Velperweg in Arnhem was commandeered by the Ortskommandantur. His brother Pieter Smidt van Gelder also was an avid art collector.

== Art collection ==
In 1944, after Operation Market Garden during the Second World War, Nazi forces led by Helmut Temmler looted Arnhem and stole 14 paintings that Smidt van Gelder had sent to a bank in the town for safe keeping. Three other paintings that had been hidden under paving slabs were saved. The Oyster Meal by Jacob Ochtervelt was one of the paintings stolen. In 2017, The Mansion House in London, in whose collection the painting by then resided, agreed to return the painting to Smidt van Gelder's daughter, Charlotte Bischoff van Heemskerck, after an investigation by Anne Webber of the Commission for Looted Art in Europe established its looted status. The Oyster Meal was restituted to Smidt van Gelder's heir on November 6, 2017.
