= Pythagorean tiling =

Tiling by squares of two sizes

- A Pythagorean tiling
- Type: uniform tiling
- Tile: square of two different sizes
- Wallpaper group: p4
- Properties: unilateral, equitransitive, not edge-to-edge

A Pythagorean tiling or two squares tessellation is a tiling of the Euclidean plane by squares of two different sizes, in which each square touches four squares of the other size on its four sides. Many proofs of the Pythagorean theorem are based on it, explaining its name. It is commonly used as a pattern for floor tiles. When used for this, it is also known as a hopscotch pattern or pinwheel pattern, but it should not be confused with the mathematical pinwheel tiling, an unrelated pattern.

This tiling has four-way rotational symmetry around each of its squares. When the ratio of the side lengths of the two squares is an irrational number such as the golden ratio, its cross-sections form aperiodic sequences with a similar recursive structure to the Fibonacci word. Generalizations of this tiling to three dimensions have also been studied.

== Topology and symmetry ==
The Pythagorean tiling is the unique tiling by squares of two different sizes that is both unilateral (no two squares have a common side) and equitransitive (each two squares of the same size can be mapped into each other by a symmetry of the tiling).

Topologically, the Pythagorean tiling has the same structure as the truncated square tiling by squares and regular octagons. The smaller squares in the Pythagorean tiling are adjacent to four larger tiles, as are the squares in the truncated square tiling, while the larger squares in the Pythagorean tiling are adjacent to eight neighbors that alternate between large and small, just as the octagons in the truncated square tiling. However, the two tilings have different sets of symmetries, because the truncated square tiling is symmetric under mirror reflections whereas the Pythagorean tiling isn't. Mathematically, this can be explained by saying that the truncated square tiling has dihedral symmetry around the center of each tile, while the Pythagorean tiling has a smaller cyclic set of symmetries around the corresponding points, giving it p4 symmetry. It is a chiral pattern, meaning that it is impossible to superpose it on top of its mirror image using only translations and rotations.

A uniform tiling is a tiling in which each tile is a regular polygon and in which every vertex can be mapped to every other vertex by a symmetry of the tiling. Usually, uniform tilings additionally are required to have tiles that meet edge-to-edge, but if this requirement is relaxed then there are eight additional uniform tilings. Four are formed from infinite strips of squares or equilateral triangles, and three are formed from equilateral triangles and regular hexagons. The remaining one is the Pythagorean tiling.

== Pythagorean theorem and dissections ==
The five-piece dissections used in the proofs by Al-Nayrizi and Thābit ibn Qurra (left) and by Henry Perigal (right)

This tiling is called the Pythagorean tiling because it has been used as the basis of proofs of the Pythagorean theorem by the ninth-century Islamic mathematicians Al-Nayrizi and Thābit ibn Qurra, and by the 19th-century British amateur mathematician Henry Perigal. If the sides of the two squares forming the tiling are the numbers a and b, then the closest distance between corresponding points on congruent squares is c, where c is the length of the hypotenuse of a right triangle having sides a and b. For instance, in the illustration to the left, the two squares in the Pythagorean tiling have side lengths 5 and 12 units long, and the side length of the tiles in the overlaying square tiling is 13, based on the Pythagorean triple (5,12,13).

By overlaying a square grid of side length c onto the Pythagorean tiling, it may be used to generate a five-piece dissection of two unequal squares of sides a and b into a single square of side c, showing that the two smaller squares have the same area as the larger one. Similarly, overlaying two Pythagorean tilings may be used to generate a six-piece dissection of two unequal squares into a different two unequal squares.

== Aperiodic cross sections ==
An aperiodic sequence generated from tilings by two squares whose side lengths form the golden ratio

Although the Pythagorean tiling is itself periodic (it has a square lattice of translational symmetries) its cross sections can be used to generate one-dimensional aperiodic sequences.

In the "Klotz construction" for aperiodic sequences (Klotz is a German word for a block), one forms a Pythagorean tiling with two squares whose sizes are chosen to make the ratio between the two side lengths be an irrational number x. Then, one chooses a line parallel to the sides of the squares, and forms a sequence of binary values from the sizes of the squares crossed by the line: a 0 corresponds to a crossing of a large square and a 1 corresponds to a crossing of a small square. In this sequence, the relative proportion of 0s and 1s will be in the ratio x:1. This proportion cannot be achieved by a periodic sequence of 0s and 1s, because it is irrational, so the sequence is aperiodic.

If x is chosen as the golden ratio, the sequence of 0s and 1s generated in this way has the same recursive structure as the Fibonacci word: it can be split into substrings of the form "01" and "0" (that is, there are no two consecutive ones) and if these two substrings are consistently replaced by the shorter strings "0" and "1" then another string with the same structure results.

== Application ==
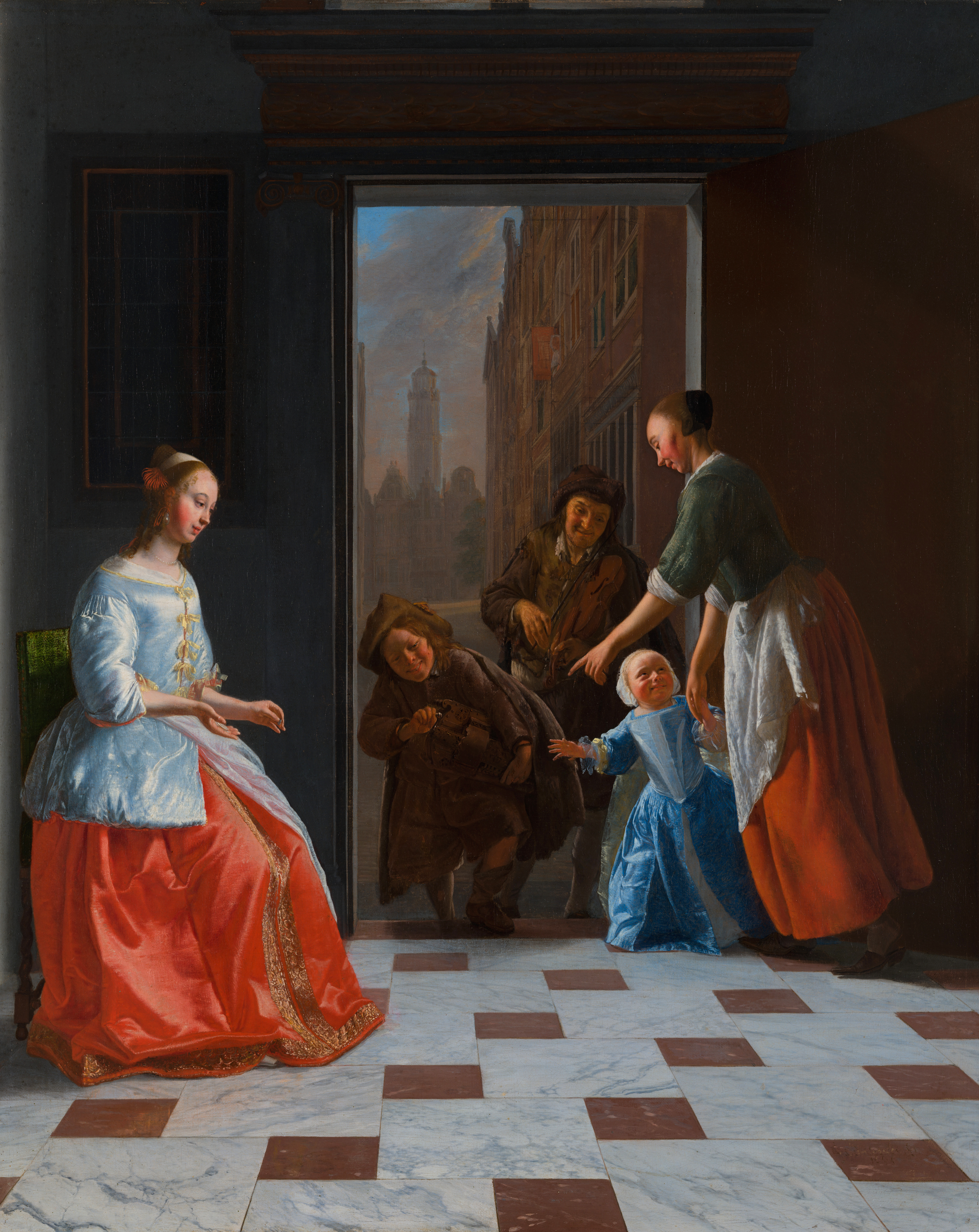
Street Musicians at the Door, Jacob Ochtervelt, 1665. As observed by Nelsen, the floor tiles in this painting are set in the Pythagorean tiling

An early structural application of the Pythagorean tiling appears in the works of Leonardo da Vinci, who considered it among several other potential patterns for floor joists. This tiling has also long been used decoratively, for floor tiles or other similar patterns, as can be seen for instance in Jacob Ochtervelt's painting Street Musicians at the Door (1665). It has been suggested that seeing a similar tiling in the palace of Polycrates may have provided Pythagoras with the original inspiration for his theorem.

== Related results ==
According to Keller's conjecture, any tiling of the plane by congruent squares must include two squares that meet edge-to-edge. None of the squares in the Pythagorean tiling meet edge-to-edge, but this fact does not violate Keller's conjecture because the tiles have different sizes, so they are not all congruent to each other.

The Pythagorean tiling may be generalized to a three-dimensional tiling of Euclidean space by cubes of two different sizes, which also is unilateral and equitransitive. Attila Bölcskei calls this three-dimensional tiling the Rogers filling. He conjectures that, in any dimension greater than three, there is again a unique unilateral and equitransitive way of tiling space by hypercubes of two different sizes.

Burns and Rigby found several prototiles, including the Koch snowflake, that may be used to tile the plane only by using copies of the prototile in two or more different sizes. An earlier paper by Danzer, Grünbaum, and Shephard provides another example, a convex pentagon that tiles the plane only when combined in two sizes. Although the Pythagorean tiling uses two different sizes of squares, the square does not have the same property as these prototiles of only tiling by similarity, because it also is possible to tile the plane using only squares of a single size.
