= Self-Portrait Wearing a White Feathered Bonnet =

1635 painting by Rembrandt

Self-portrait wearing a white feathered bonnet
- Self-portrait
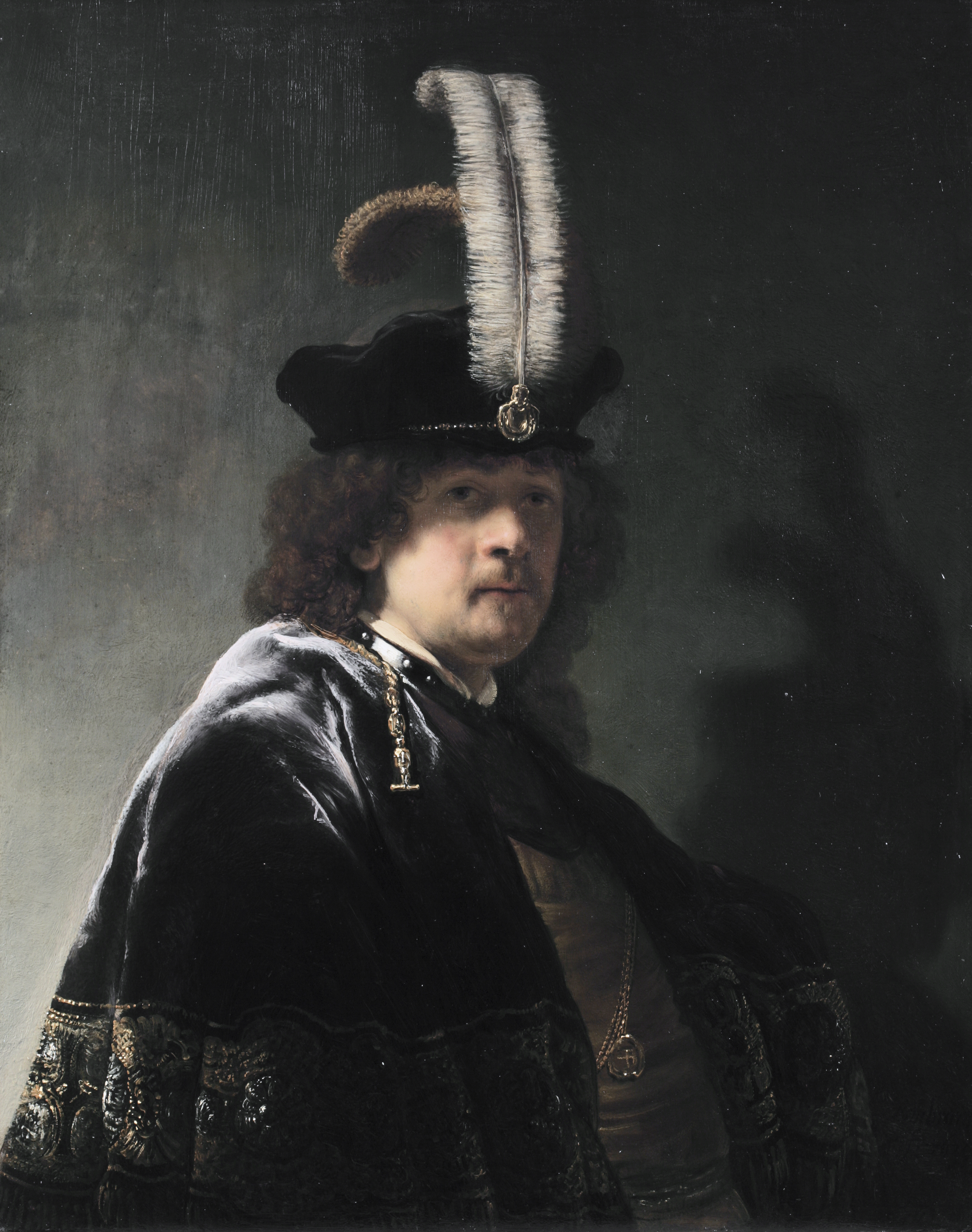
- Artist: Rembrandt
- Year: 1635
- Medium: oil paint, panel
- Dimensions: 90.5 cm (35.6 in) × 71.8 cm (28.3 in)
- Location: Buckland Abbey

Self-portrait wearing a white feathered bonnet is an oil painting attributed to the Dutch painter Rembrandt. It is signed and dated 1635. It was traditionally regarded as a Rembrandt self-portrait until 1968, when it was rejected on stylistic grounds in the Rembrandt catalogue raisonné by Horst Gerson. In 2013, art historian Ernst van de Wetering re-attributed the painting as an original Rembrandt. It is one of over 40 painted self-portraits by Rembrandt.

== Painting ==
The self-portrait shows Rembrandt at half length facing towards the right, wearing a velvet cape decorated with gold embroidery over a gorget. A medallion hangs from a gold chain around his neck. He is wearing a black velvet beret shading his eyes and from the front of it, another medallion supports two vertical ostrich feathers.

This painting was documented by Hofstede de Groot in 1915, who wrote; "584. PORTRAIT OF THE PAINTER. Bode 131; Dut. 141; Wb. 373; B.-HdG. 174. Half-length; life size. He stands in profile to the right, turning his head and eyes to the spectator. He has thick curly hair, and indications of a moustache and an imperial. He wears a velvet cap with two tall coloured ostrich feathers fastened with a gold clasp. A short purplish-grey cape, with a broad edging embroidered in gold and fringed, hangs open over the yellowish costume, showing a steel gorget and the shirt-collar. From the right shoulder hangs a short chain; on the breast is a thin double gold chain with a medallion. He seems to rest both hands on his hips under the cape. Bright light falls from the left at top on the plumes in the cap, the lower part of the face, and the right shoulder. Rather dark background, against which the shadow of the plumed cap is relieved to the right. Signed, "Rembrandt f. 1635"; oak panel, 36 1/2 inches by 28 1/2 inches. A copy is in the Wiesbaden Museum; see Moes, No. 6693, 34. Another copy, without the feathers in the cap, is in the National Museum, Rome, No. 761. Engraved by J. Pichler, 1791; etched by W. Unger. Mentioned by Vosmaer, p. 508; Bode, pp. 411, 576; Dutuit, p. 50; Michel, pp. 215, 560 [166, 430]; Moes, Iconographia Batava, No. 6693, 33. Exhibited at Leyden, 1906, No. 40. In the collection of Prince Liechtenstein, Vienna, 1885 catalogue, No. 84."

== Provenance ==
- 1635 – The self-portrait is signed and dated bottom right Rembran(..) / f (three triangular dots) 1635
- 1727 – First recorded in the collection catalogue of Joseph Wenzel I, Prince of Liechtenstein
- 1968 – Excluded from Gerson's lists
- Art dealers Edward Speelman Ltd., London (date unclear)
- before 1987 – Sold by Speelman to Harold Samuel, Baron Samuel of Wych Cross
- 2010 – Donated in September 2010 to the collection of the British National Trust from the estate of the late Edna, Lady Samuel of Wych Cross
- 2010 – Installed in Buckland Abbey, a National Trust site
- 2013 – Visited by Ernst van de Wetering

== Attribution ==
The accreditation of this work to Rembrandt was never disputed until Gerson's rejection solely based on stylistic grounds. The Rembrandt Research Project came into being in order to confirm or deny such claims of rejection or attribution by using forensic and historical evidence. According to Ernst van de Wetering, who was on Gerson's team in 1968, he still shares their original concerns about the painting, but the attribution to Rembrandt can be made with much more certainty today based both on historical grounds and x-ray evidence. Rembrandt painted the self-portrait during the period he was playing with light and shadow around the eyes; the beret hides his eyes and his nose and cheek become the light source, with a light reflection visible on the lower eyelid. During the same period, Rembrandt made many portraits and even self-portraits with feathered hats, and he is known for various sketches and portraits with light reflecting on lower eyelids.

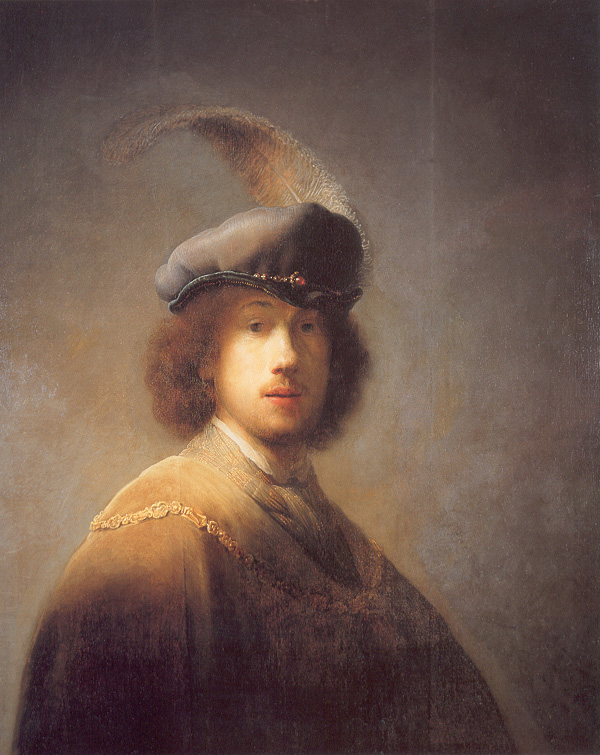
Self-portrait with plumed beret, 1629, Isabella Stewart Gardner Museum, Boston

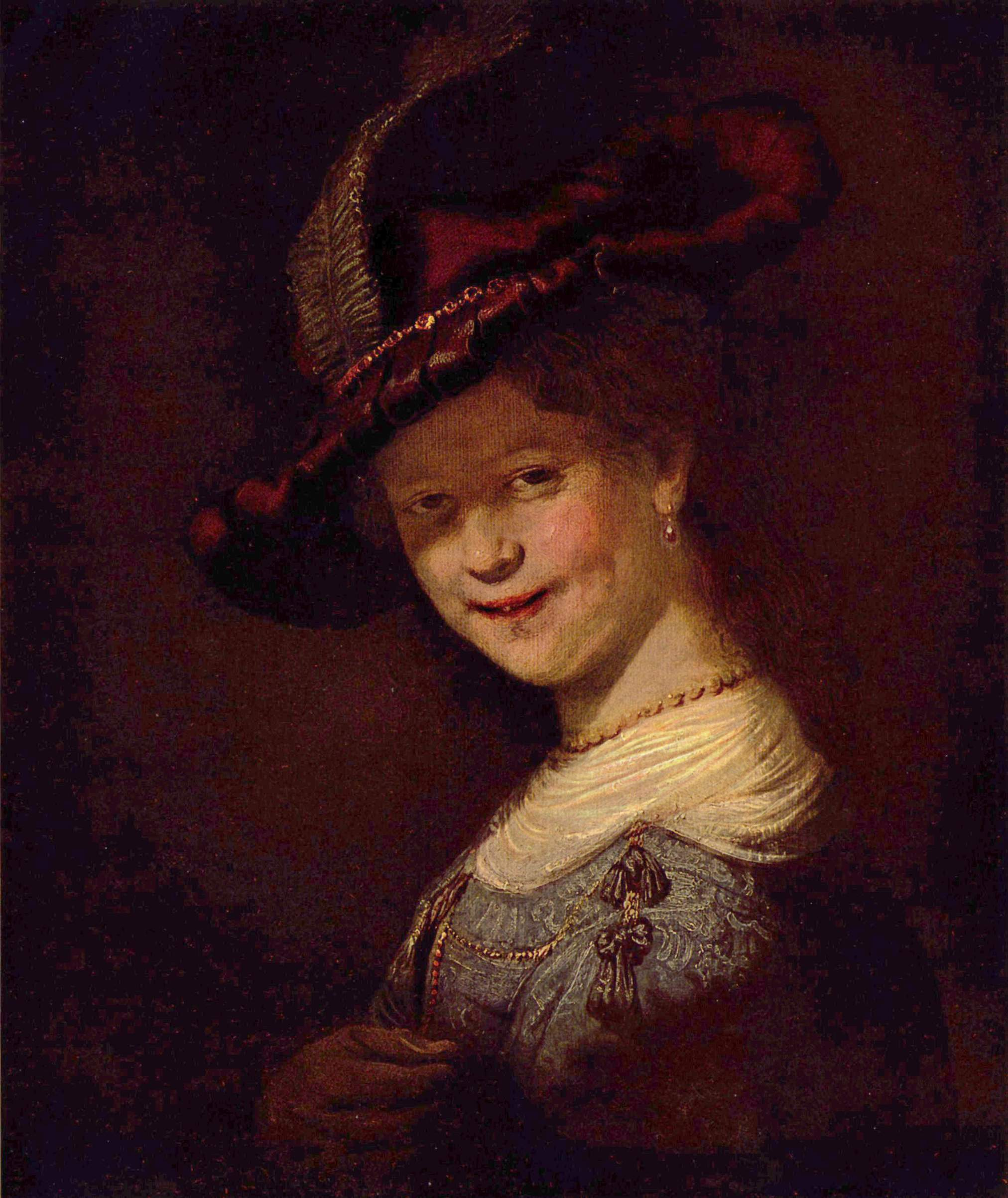
Bust of a laughing, young woman, possibly Saskia van Uylenburgh, 1633, Gemäldegalerie Alte Meister, Dresden

=== Former attributions ===
The self-portrait wearing a white feathered bonnet was first attributed to Rembrandt by Kurt Bauch (1966, nr. 309), then challenged by Horst Gerson (1968, nr. 171), then attributed to Govert Flinck by Christian Tümpel (1986, nr. A 64), and after new photographs were taken in 1987, re-attributed to the master (with help from a pupil) by Leonard J. Slatkes (1992, nr. 251).

== Feathered bonnet ==
According to Van de Wetering, the feathered bonnet painting can be dated with certainty based on a series of etchings Rembrandt made for his Christ before Pilate painting. He made a small self-portrait of himself on a balcony wearing the feathered bonnet and only the top of his head is visible. The self-portrait is included in various stages of the etching but is only visible as a "blob" in the painting.

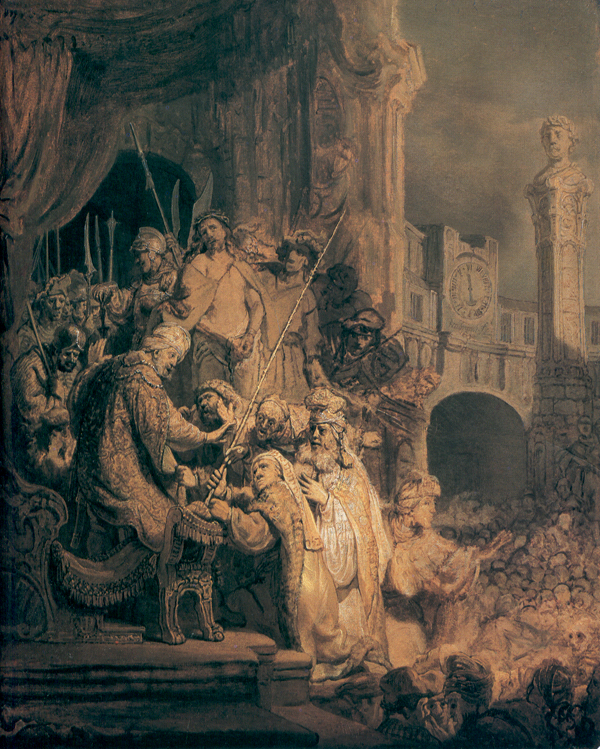
Christ before Pilate, 1634, National Gallery, London

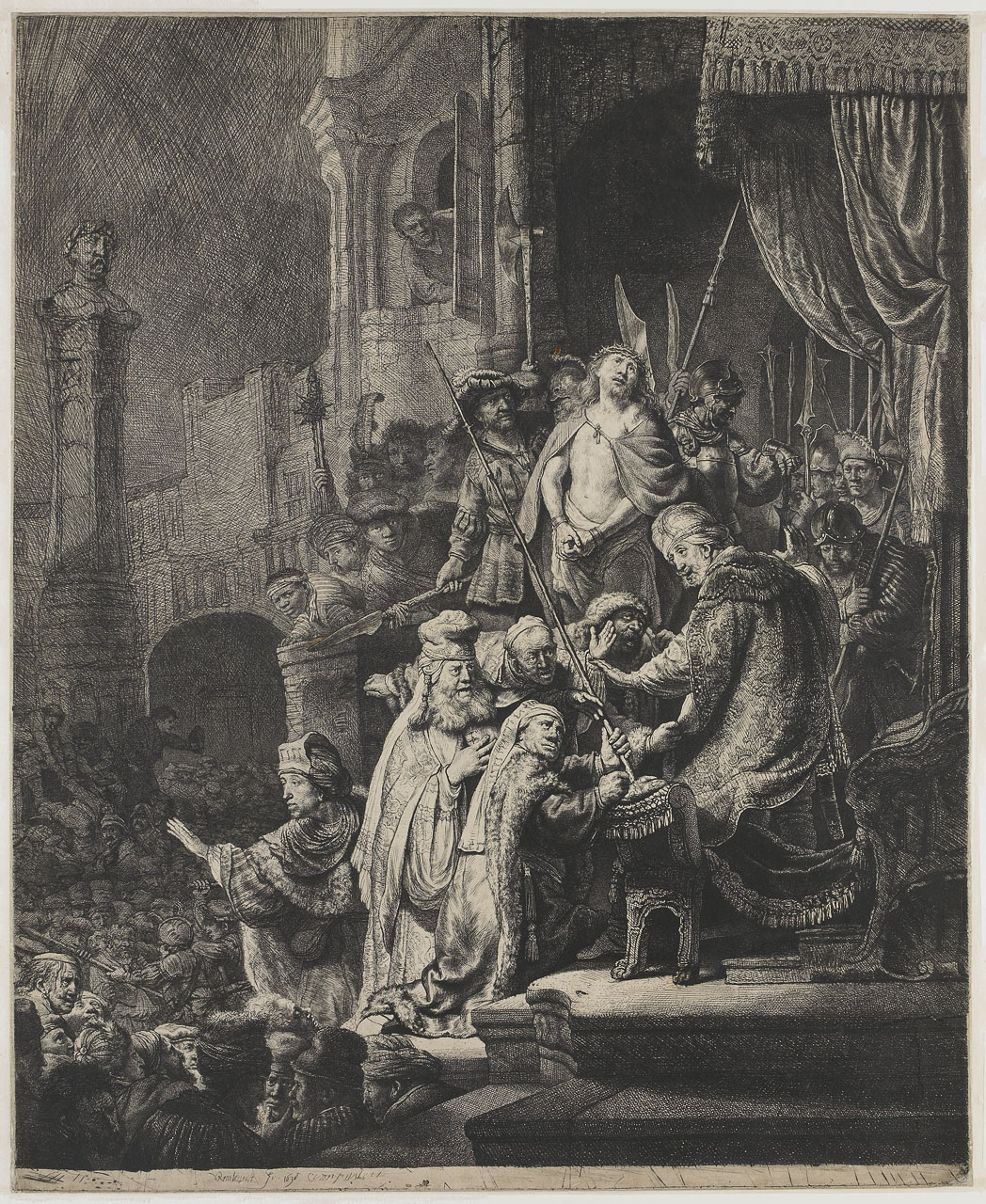
Christ before Pilate, 1636, Rijksmuseum, Amsterdam

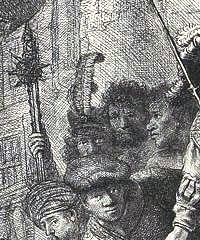
Christ before Pilate; detail showing self-portrait of Rembrandt in feathered bonnet

== Restoration and display ==
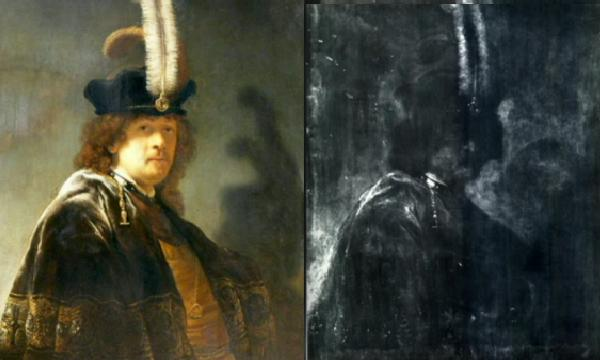
Rembrandt Self-portrait wearing a white feathered bonnet shown with x-ray of it. This is proof that it is not a period copy of an original oil painting, because it shows "exploratory primary work", or changes during the painting process.

David Taylor, curator of the National Trust's Paintings and Sculpture collection, reported that the painting was scheduled to be restored during the winter months of 2013/2014 when, it was hoped, more information about its authorship would be revealed. Van de Wetering made his tentative re-attribution after studying the x-ray in 2005, but it was only after recently visiting the painting at Buckland Abbey that he could state with certainty that his 2005 claim was indeed true. Van de Wetering had wanted to see the painting in 2005, but it was only after it was given to the National Trust in 2010 that he knew where it was.

The work has become one of the top pieces in the Paintings and Sculpture collection of the National Trust, which oversees approximately 13,500 paintings in properties spread across England and Wales. It is on display at Buckland Abbey, a historic house based on a Cistercian monastery, and then owned by Sir Richard Grenville after the Dissolution of the Monasteries and Sir Francis Drake (who bought it after him). In June 2014, after eight months of work at the Hamilton Kerr Institute, the painting's authenticity was confirmed and its value estimated at £20m.

== See also ==
- Self-portraits by Rembrandt
- List of paintings by Rembrandt
