= Square trisection =

Cutting a square into pieces which rearrange into 3 identical squares

In geometry, a square trisection is a type of dissection problem which consists of cutting a square into pieces that can be rearranged to form three identical squares.

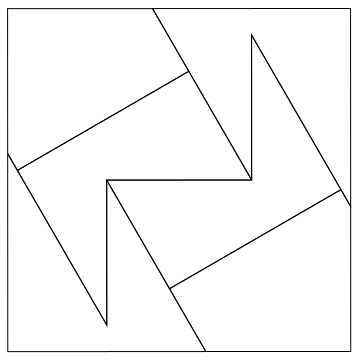
Square trisection using 6 pieces of same area (2010).

== History ==
The dissection of a square in three congruent partitions is a geometrical problem that dates back to the Islamic Golden Age. Craftsman who mastered the art of zellige needed innovative techniques to achieve their fabulous mosaics with complex geometric figures. The first solution to this problem was proposed in the 10th century AD by the Persian mathematician Abu'l-Wafa' (940-998) in his treatise "On the geometric constructions necessary for the artisan". Abu'l-Wafa' also used his dissection to demonstrate the Pythagorean theorem. This geometrical proof of Pythagoras' theorem would be rediscovered in the years 1835 - 1840 by Henry Perigal and published in 1875.

== Search of optimality ==
The beauty of a dissection depends on several parameters. However, it is usual to search for solutions with the minimum number of parts. Far from being minimal, the square trisection proposed by Abu'l-Wafa' uses 9 pieces. In the 14th century Abu Bakr al-Khalil gave two solutions, one of which uses 8 pieces. In the late 17th century Jacques Ozanam came back to this issue and in the 19th century, solutions using 8 and 7 pieces were found, including one given by the mathematician Édouard Lucas. In 1891 Henry Perigal published the first known solution with only 6 pieces (see illustration below). Nowadays, new dissections are still found (see illustration above) and the conjecture that 6 is the minimal number of necessary pieces remains unproved.

== See also ==
- Proofs by dissection and rearrangement of Pythagorean theorem
- Dissection puzzle
- Tangram

== Bibliography ==
- Frederickson, Greg N. (1997). Dissections: Plane and Fancy. Cambridge University Press. ISBN 0-521-57197-9.
- Frederickson, Greg N. (2002). Hinged Dissections: Swinging and Twisting. Cambridge University Press. ISBN 0-521-81192-9.
- Frederickson, Greg N. (2006). Piano-hinged Dissections: Time to Fold!. en:A K Peters. ISBN 1-56881-299-X.
