= Voorhuis =

Voorhuis may refer to:

- Jorien Voorhuis, Dutch speedskater
- Voorhuis (painting), a Dutch painting genre of the 17th century
