= Hadwiger conjecture =

There are several conjectures known as the Hadwiger conjecture or Hadwiger's conjecture. They include:

- Hadwiger conjecture (graph theory), a relationship between the number of colors needed by a given graph and the size of its largest clique minor
- Hadwiger conjecture (combinatorial geometry) that for any n-dimensional convex body, at most 2^{n} smaller homothetic bodies are necessary to contain the original
- Hadwiger's conjecture on dissection into orthoschemes

== See also ==
- Hadwiger–Nelson problem on the chromatic number of unit distance graphs in the Euclidean plane
- Hadwiger's theorem characterizing measure functions in Euclidean spaces
