= Street Musicians at the Door =

Painting by Jacob Ochtervelt

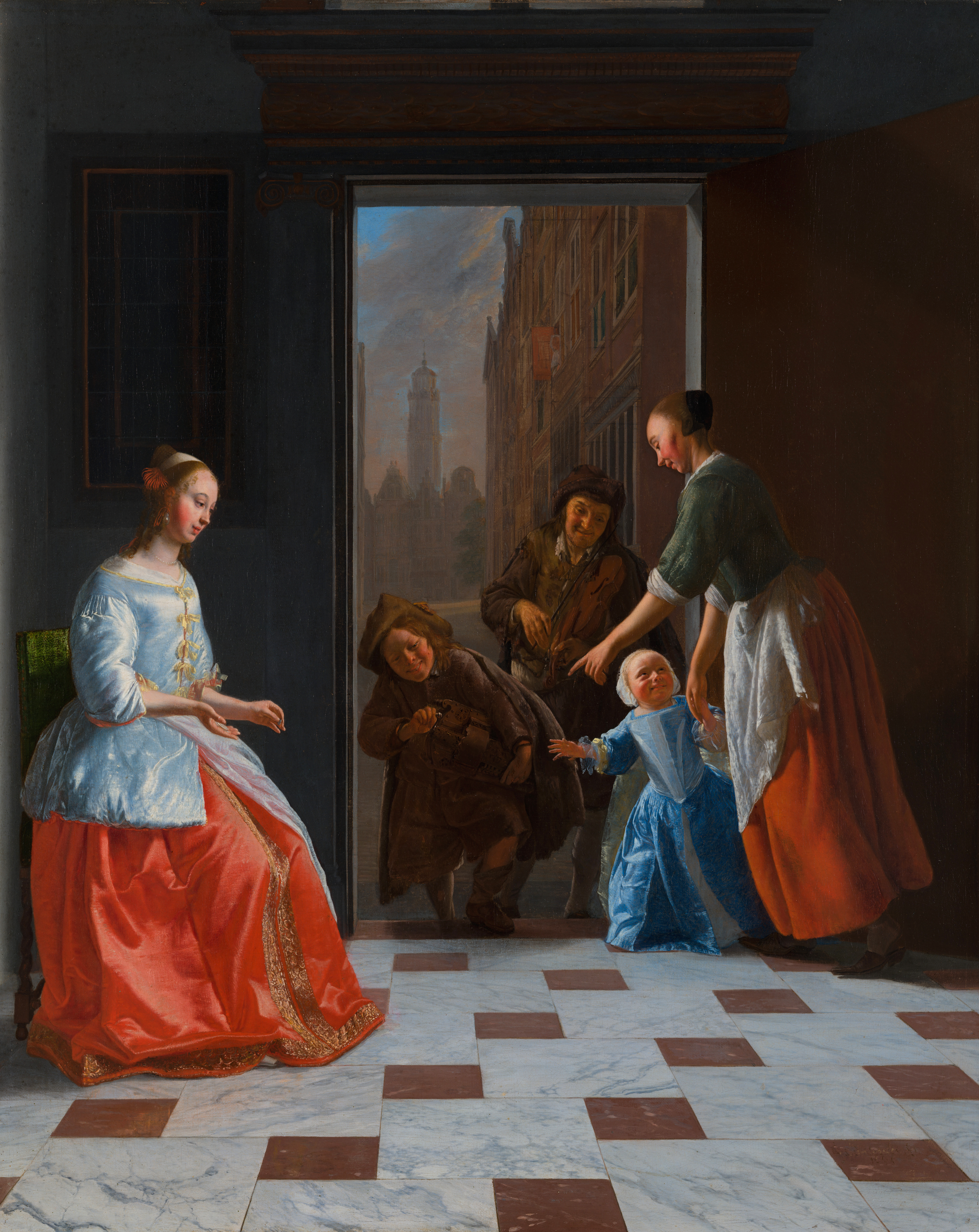
Street Musicians at the Door (1665)

Street Musicians at the Door (Dutch: Straatmuzikanten aan de deur) is an oil painting depicting members of a wealthy family interacting with two begging musicians at the door of their house. Dutch Golden Age artist Jacob Ochtervelt (1634–1682) painted it in Rotterdam in 1665, as an example of the "entrance hall painting", a genre he pioneered. It is in the collection of the Saint Louis Art Museum.

== Content and interpretation ==
Street Musicians at the Door depicts members of a wealthy family (a mother, child, and a maid) interacting in a friendly encounter with two musicians at the door of their house, who play a violin and a hurdy-gurdy. Ochtervelt used this setting to show the contact between the two worlds of the wealthy inhabitants within the house and the poor street people beyond. The maid and child act as intermediaries between these two worlds, with the mother showing her child how to give alms to the begging musicians. The scene reflects the morés of the time, in which beggars were expected to perform some small service (in this case, playing music) that they could be paid for. Although most critics agree that music is depicted here in a positive light, as a beneficial influence on children's minds, a dissenting view holds that the low opinion of music in Dutch Calvinism is borne out by the low position of the musicians in the painting.

== Painting style ==
The painting style of Street Musicians at the Door uses variations in color and technique to contrast the two worlds that it depicts. The women of the house are lit brightly and dressed colorfully, and the interior is depicted carefully and precisely. The exterior streetscape leading to a church is again drawn in perspective, but appears flattened, muted, darkened, and roughly painted. The people in the painting, similarly, are shown in different styles, contrasting the dignified faces of the women with the more caricatured depiction of the musicians.

A minor detail of the interior, the Pythagorean tiling of its flooring, has been called out as an example of the long history of use of this tiling pattern.

== Provenance and collection ==
Street Musicians at the Door was owned in the late 18th century by French art dealer Jean-Baptiste-Pierre Lebrun, and later by Dorothy L. Liggett Kilpatrick (Mrs. Claude Kilpatrick), a daughter of tobacconist and Liggett Group founder John E. Liggett. Kilpatrick bequested it to the Saint Louis Art Museum on her death in 1928, and the gift was carried out by her daughter, Mary Lois Kilpatrick Perry (Mrs. Eugene A. Perry). As of 2020 it is on display in the museum's galleries.

== Related works ==
Similar doorway settings were frequently used by Ochtervelt, as the first examples of a genre that became known as "entrance hall painting"; Street Musicians has been called "one of the more striking examples" of this genre. The doorway, in Street Musicians and these other paintings, acts as a picture frame through which the rest of the world can be observed. Two more of Ochtervelt's entrance hall paintings also depict scenes with street musicians; others include sellers of fish and produce, similarly shown through the door of a home.
