= Henry Perigal =

British astronomer and mathematician (1801–1898)

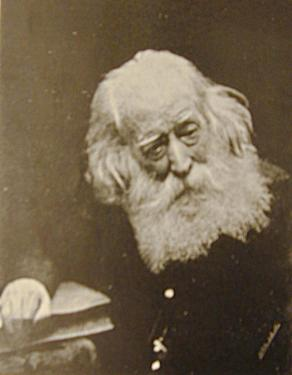
- Henry Perigal
- Born: 1 April 1801
- Died: 6 June 1898 (aged 97)
- Known for: Pythagorean theorem
- Scientific career
- Fields: Mathematics, Astronomy

Henry Perigal, Jr. FRAS MRI (1 April 1801 – 6 June 1898) was a British stockbroker and amateur mathematician, known for his dissection-based proof of the Pythagorean theorem and for his unorthodox belief that the moon does not rotate.

== Biography ==
Perigal descended from a Huguenot family who emigrated to England in the late 17th century, and was the oldest of six siblings. After working as a clerk for the Privy Council, he became a bookkeeper in a London stockbrokerage in the 1840s. He remained a lifelong bachelor.

Perigal was a member of the London Mathematical Society from 1868 to 1897, and was treasurer of the Royal Meteorological Society for 45 years, from 1853 until his death in 1898. He was elected as a fellow of the Royal Astronomical Society in 1850. He attended the Royal Institution regularly as a visitor for many years, and finally became a member in 1895, at age 94. Friends with Washington Teasdale and James Glaisher. He was an original member of the British Astronomical Association in 1890; he would be oldest member of the BAA if all the members were gathered together. Although Perigal was long-lived, his father lived even longer, becoming a centenarian.

== Mathematics ==
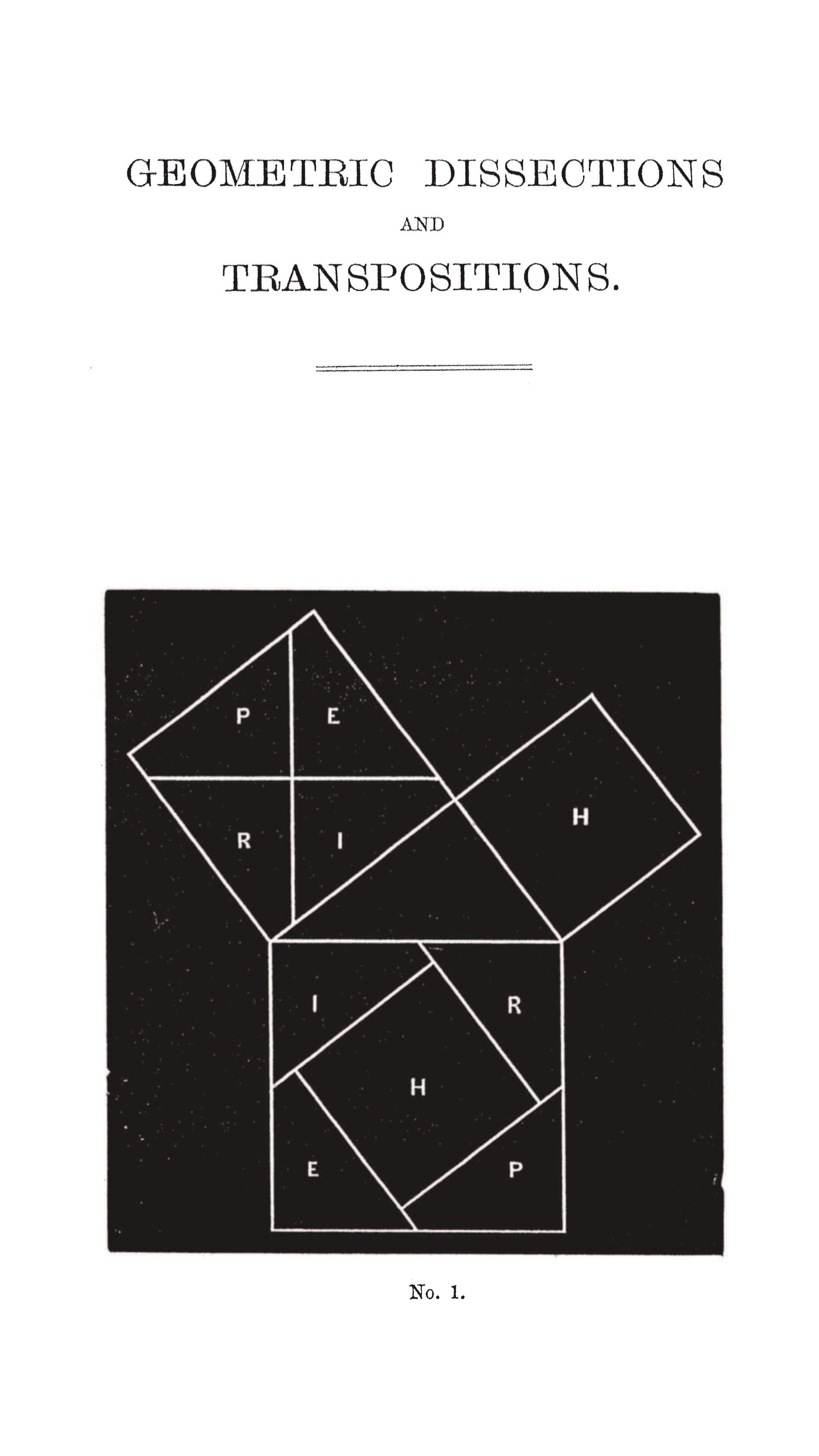
Page 1 of Geometric Dissections and Transpositions, showing Perigal's dissection-based proof of the Pythagorean theorem

In his booklet Geometric Dissections and Transpositions (London: Bell & Sons, 1891) Perigal provided a proof of the Pythagorean theorem based on the idea of dissecting two smaller squares into a larger square. The five-piece dissection that he found may be generated by overlaying a regular square tiling whose prototile is the larger square with a Pythagorean tiling generated by the two smaller squares. Perigal had the same dissection printed on his business cards, and it also appears on his tombstone, which is located within the grounds of St Mary and St Peter, Wennington, Essex, now the London Borough of Havering.

In the same book, Perigal expressed the hope that dissection based methods would also solve the 1925 Tarski's problem of circle-squaring by dissection. That problem had been shown to be impossible to solve in a constructive way in 1963. Nevertheless, a non-constructive solution has been proposed by Miklós Laczkovich in 1990.

Perigal also proposed the first 6-pieces solution to the square trisection problem.

As well as being interested in mathematics, Perigal was an accomplished lathe worker, and made models of mathematical curves for Augustus De Morgan. He falsely believed that the moon does not rotate with respect to the fixed stars, and used his knowledge of curvilinear motion in an attempt to demonstrate this belief to others.
