= Hinged dissection =

Geometric partition where pieces are connected by "hinged" points

Loop animation of hinged dissections from triangle to square, then to hexagon, then back again to triangle. Notice that the chain of pieces can be entirely connected in a ring during the rearrangement from square to hexagon.

In geometry, a hinged dissection, also known as a swing-hinged dissection or Dudeney dissection, is a kind of geometric dissection in which all of the pieces are connected into a chain by "hinged" points, such that the rearrangement from one figure to another can be carried out by swinging the chain continuously, without severing any of the connections. Typically, it is assumed that the pieces are allowed to overlap in the folding and unfolding process; this is sometimes called the "wobbly-hinged" model of hinged dissection.

== History ==
Dudeney's hinged dissection of a triangle into a square.

Animation of hinged dissection from hexagram to triangle to square

The concept of hinged dissections was popularised by the author of mathematical puzzles, Henry Dudeney. He proposed in 1902 the hinged dissection of a square into a triangle and C.W. McElroy submitted the famous four-piece solution (pictured) that Dudeney published in his 1907 book The Canterbury Puzzles. The Wallace–Bolyai–Gerwien theorem, first proven in 1807, states that any two equal-area polygons must have a common dissection. However, the question of whether two such polygons must also share a hinged dissection remained open until 2007, when Erik Demaine et al. proved that there must always exist such a hinged dissection, and provided a constructive algorithm to produce them. This proof holds even under the assumption that the pieces may not overlap while swinging, and can be generalised to any pair of three-dimensional figures which have a common dissection (see Hilbert's third problem). In three dimensions, however, the pieces are not guaranteed to swing without overlap.

== Other hinges ==
Hinged square to pentagon

Other types of "hinges" have been considered in the context of dissections. A twist-hinge dissection is one which use a three-dimensional "hinge" which is placed on the edges of pieces rather than their vertices, allowing them to be "flipped" three-dimensionally. As of 2002, the question of whether any two polygons must have a common twist-hinged dissection remains unsolved.

== Bibliography ==
- Frederickson, Greg N. (26 August 2002). Hinged Dissections: Swinging and Twisting. Cambridge University Press. ISBN 978-0521811927.
