= Washington Teasdale =

British engineer and photographer

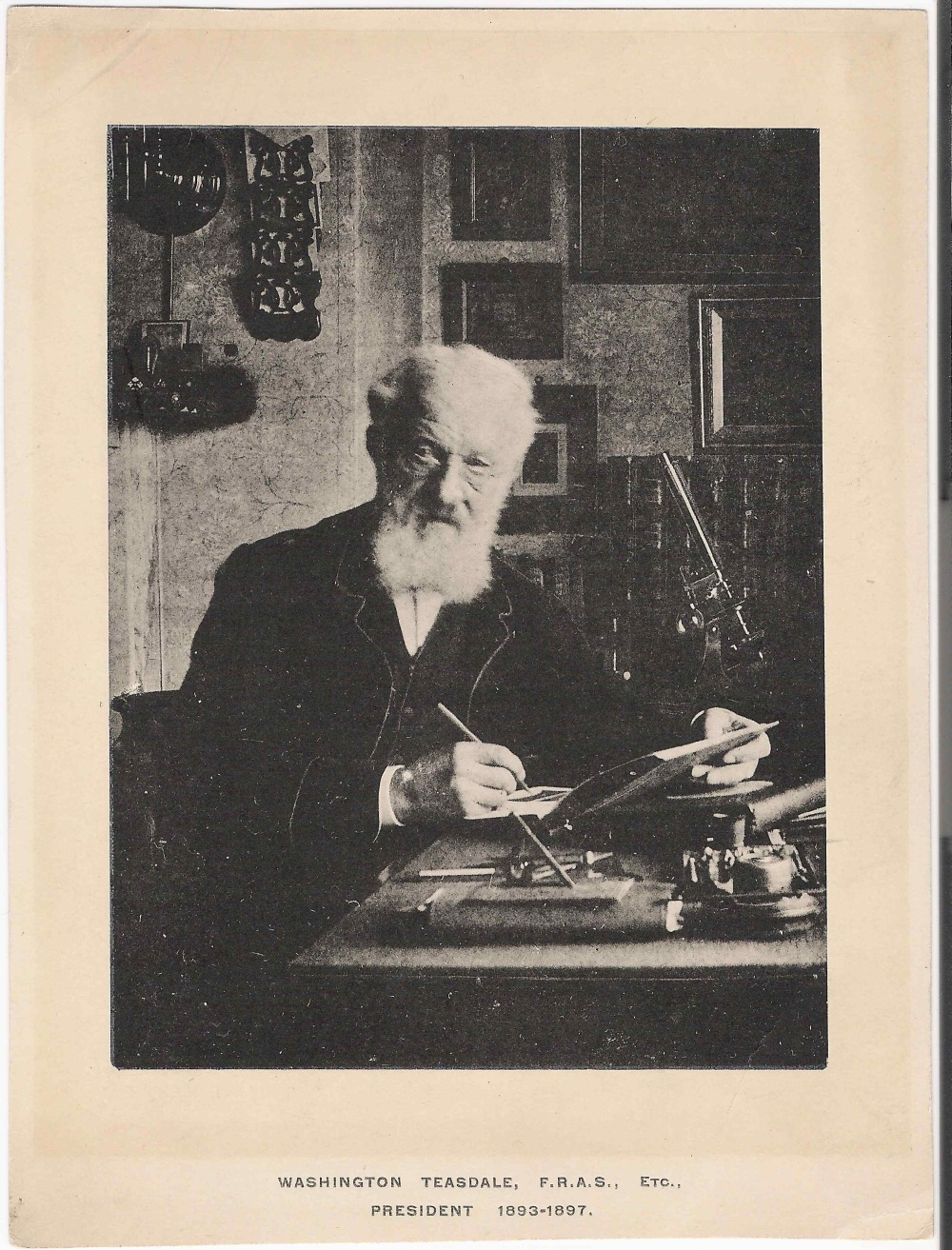
Teasdale as President of the Leeds Astronomical Society

Washington Teasdale (8 August 1830 – 19 September 1903) was an engineer and photographer. He invented the field naturalist's microscope and was one of the first people to use lantern slides.

== Early life ==
He was born in Brunswick Place, Leeds, Yorkshire to a wealthy family. Teasdale trained to be an engineer and worked in India on engineering projects. He became fluent in Hindi, and according to his obituary, continued to think in it all his life. His particular scientific interest was in photography. He was one of the first people to prepare and use lantern slides in lectures.

== Man of science ==
Teasdale, who delivered hundreds of lectures throughout his lifetime, was a founding member of the Leeds Photographic Society, the Royal Society of Microscopy and was a Fellow of the Royal Astronomical Society. Part of his photography collection, including cyanotype photography, is held at the Museum of the History of Science, Oxford. He photographed his scientific friends Henry Perigal and James Glaisher. As part of his work with the Society of Microscopy he invented the Field Naturalist's Microscope – a portable instrument of magnification. He died whilst attending a meeting of the British Association for the Advancement of Science.
