= Al-Nayrizi =

Persian mathematician and astronomer

- أبو العباس الفضل بن حاتم النيريزي
- Born: c. 865
- Died: c. 922 (aged c.56-57)

Academic work
- Era: Islamic Golden Age
- Main interests: Mathematics, astronomy

Abū’l-'Abbās al-Faḍl ibn Ḥātim al-Nairīzī (Arabic: أبو العباس الفضل بن حاتم النيريزي; Persian: ابوالعباس فضل بن حاتم نیریزی; Latin: Anaritius, Nazirius, c. 865 – c. 922) was a Persian mathematician and astronomer from Nayriz, now in Fars province, Iran.

== Life ==
Little is known of al-Nairīzī, though his nisba refers to the town of Neyriz. He mentioned al-Mu'tadid, the Abbasid caliph, in his works, and so scholars have assumed that al-Nairīzī flourished in Baghdad during this period. Al-Nairīzī wrote a book for al-Mu'tadid on atmospheric phenomena. He died in c. 922.

== Mathematics ==
Al-Nayrizi wrote a commentary to the translation in Arabic by Al-Ḥajjāj ibn Yūsuf ibn Maṭar of Euclid's Elements. Both the translation and the commentary have survived, as well as a 12th-century Latin translation by Gerard of Cremona. Al-Nayrizi's commentary contains unique extracts of two other commentaries on the Elements, produced by Hero of Alexandria and Simplicius of Cilicia.

Al-Nairīzī used the umbra (versa), the equivalent to the tangent, as a genuine trigonometric line, as did the Persian astronomer al-Marwazi before him. He gave a proof of the Pythagorean theorem using the Pythagorean tiling.

Al-Nayrizi gave a mathematical proof of the parallel postulate based on the assumption that parallel lines are equidistant. He wrote a treatise on an exact method for the numerical determination of the qibla and a text about a device for measuring the heights, widths, and depths.

== Astronomy ==
Al-Nairīzī wrote a treatise on the spherical astrolabe, an elaborate work that seems to be the best Persian work on the subject. It is divided into four books:

1. An historical and critical introduction of the astrolabe;
2. A description of the instrument; and a comparison with other astronomical instruments;
3. Applications of the instrument;
4. Applications of the instrument.

Ibn al-Nadim mentions Nayrizi as a distinguished astronomer with eight works by him listed in his book al-Fihrist.

Al-Nayrizi's most important astronomical works, his commentary on Ptolemy's Almagest and both his zijes, are lost. He produced treatises on the spherical astrolabe and astrological conjunctions, both of which are extant.

== Sources ==
- Hogendijk, J.P. (1986). "Al-Nayrīzī". The Encyclopaedia of Islam. Vol. 7. Leiden: Brill. ISBN 90-04-09419-9.
- Nelsen, Roger B. (2003). "Paintings, plane tilings, and proofs" (PDF). Math Horizons. 11 (2). Mathematical Association of America: 5–8. doi:10.1080/10724117.2003.12021741. S2CID 126000048. Archived from the original (PDF) on April 1, 2007.
- Sarton, George (1962). Introduction to the History of Science. Vol. 1. Baltimore, Maryland: Published for the Carnegie Institution of Washington, by the Williams & Wilkins Co. OCLC 1238437.

=== Texts and translations ===
- Euclid (1893). Besthorn, R. O.; Heiberg, J. L. (eds.). Codex Leidensis 339, I. Euclidis Elementa (in Latin and Arabic). Translated by Abū ʹl ʹAbbās al-Fadhl ibn Hātim al-Narīzī. Haunia (Copenhagen): Libraria Glydendaliana. OCLC 66287985.
- Al-Nairīzī, Abū’l-'Abbās al-Faḍl ibn Ḥātim (1993). Tummers, P. M. J. E. (ed.). Anaritius' Commentary on Euclid. The Latin Translation, I-IV (in Latin). Turnhout: Brepols. ISBN 978-90-70419-35-6.
