= Edward Speelman =

British art dealer (1910–1994)

Edward Joseph Speelman (16 May 1910 – 29 August 1994) was an English art dealer. While serving in the British Army during the Second World War, he arrested Artur Seyss-Inquart, the Reich Commissioner for the Netherlands.

== Early life and family ==
Edward Speelman was born in the Willesden district of London on 16 May 1910 to Dutch-born parents. His father was a fine art dealer and his brother Alfred entered the same trade specialising in Asian art. He was educated at University College School, Hampstead.

He married Sadie De Casseres in Marylebone, London, in 1937, with whom he had a son.

== Career ==
Speelman began his career in the art business at the Dutch firm Duits where he was employed to help form a photographic library. He then moved to Legers in London's Bond Street. He subsequently started his own business but never expanded it beyond two rooms despite completing many large sales. A strong linguist he was able to form a profitable association with the Dutch dealer Nathan Katz, who spoke no English, and he often collaborated with Colin Agnew and Claude Partridge. He was a specialist in Dutch painting and formed the collection of Netherlandish works that was owned by Harold Samuel and given after Samuel's death to the Mansion House.

He served as an intelligence officer with the British Army during the Second World War and was appointed as a liaison officer between the Dutch and British forces. He personally arrested Artur Seyss-Inquart, the Reich Commissioner for the Netherlands, who was subsequently hanged as a war criminal. Speelman was mentioned in despatches and made a Knight of the Order of Orange-Nassau in recognition of his wartime service.

He owned racehorses and with Klairon won the French 2000 Guineas in 1955. He was a keen golfer and retired to France and Switzerland.

He funded a post-graduate research fellowship at Wolfson College, University of Cambridge, in Dutch and Flemish painting.

== Death ==
Speelman died in Lausanne, Switzerland, on 29 August 1994. He was survived by his wife and son.

== Nazi-looted art ==
In his career as an art dealer, Speelman purchased and sold several paintings that were later discovered to have been looted by the Nazis. In 2017 The Oyster Meal, by Jacob Ochtervelt, which Speelman had sold to collector Harold Samuel, was discovered to have been looted by Nazis from Dr Smidt van Gelder, director of the children’s hospital in Arnhem. Speelman had acquired it from J William Middendorf, an American diplomat. Also in 2017 a settlement was reached concerning a painting by Michele Marieschi between the family of an Austrian Jewish art collector who had been looted by the Gestapo and a foundation in possession of the work. Speelman had sold the painting. On October 7, 2021, "View of Beverwijk" by Salomon van Ruysdael was deaccessioned by the Museum of Fine Arts, Boston in order to restitute it to the heirs of Ferenc Chorin, who had been looted by the Nazis. The Museum had purchased the painting from Speelman on September 15, 1982.
