= The Canterbury Puzzles =

1907 mathematical puzzle book by Henry Dudeney

- 3rd edition (publ. Nelson, 1929)
- Author: Henry Dudeney
- Subject: Puzzles
- Publication date: 1907
- ISBN: 978-0486425580

The Canterbury Puzzles and Other Curious Problems is a 1907 mathematical puzzle book by Henry Dudeney. The first part of the book features a series of puzzles based on the characters from The Canterbury Tales by Geoffrey Chaucer.
