= Dissection into orthoschemes =

Unsolved problem in mathematics
Can every simplex be dissected into a bounded number of orthoschemes?
More unsolved problems in mathematics

In geometry, it is an unsolved conjecture of Hugo Hadwiger that every simplex can be dissected into orthoschemes, using a number of orthoschemes bounded by a function of the dimension of the simplex. If true, then more generally every convex polytope could be dissected into orthoschemes.

== Definitions and statement ==
In this context, a simplex in $d$-dimensional Euclidean space is the convex hull of $d+1$ points that do not all lie in a common hyperplane. For example, a 2-dimensional simplex is just a triangle (the convex hull of three points in the plane) and a 3-dimensional simplex is a tetrahedron (the convex of four points in three-dimensional space). The points that form the simplex in this way are called its vertices.

An orthoscheme, also called a path simplex, is a special kind of simplex. In it, the vertices can be connected by a path, such that every two edges in the path are at right angles to each other. A two-dimensional orthoscheme is a right triangle. A three-dimensional orthoscheme can be constructed from a cube by finding a path of three edges of the cube that do not all lie on the same square face, and forming the convex hull of the four vertices on this path.

Dissection of a cube into six orthoschemes

A dissection of a shape $S$ (which may be any closed set in Euclidean space) is a representation of $S$ as a union of other shapes whose interiors are disjoint from each other. That is, intuitively, the shapes in the union do not overlap, although they may share points on their boundaries. For instance, a cube can be dissected into six three-dimensional orthoschemes. A similar result applies more generally: every hypercube or hyperrectangle in $d$ dimensions can be dissected into $d!$ orthoschemes.

Hadwiger's conjecture is that there is a function $f$ such that every $d$-dimensional simplex can be dissected into at most $f(d)$ orthoschemes. Hadwiger posed this problem in 1956; it remains unsolved in general, although special cases for small values of $d$ are known.

== In small dimensions ==
The altitude from a sharp angle may fail to dissect a triangle, but the altitude from its widest angle always dissects it into two right triangles

In two dimensions, every triangle can be dissected into at most two right triangles, by dropping an altitude from its widest angle onto its longest edge.

In three dimensions, some tetrahedra can be dissected in a similar way, by dropping an altitude perpendicularly from a vertex $v$ to a point $p$ in an opposite face, connecting $p$ perpendicularly to the sides of the face, and using the three-edge perpendicular paths through $v$ and $p$ to a side and then to a vertex of the face. However, this does not always work. In particular, there exist tetrahedra for which none of the vertices have altitudes with a foot inside the opposite face. Using a more complicated construction, Lenhard (1960) proved that every tetrahedron can be dissected into at most 12 orthoschemes. Böhm (1980) proved that this is optimal: there exist tetrahedra that cannot be dissected into fewer than 12 orthoschemes. In the same paper, Böhm also generalized Lenhard's result to three-dimensional spherical geometry and three-dimensional hyperbolic geometry.

In four dimensions, at most 500 orthoschemes are needed. In five dimensions, a finite number of orthoschemes is again needed, roughly bounded as at most 12.5 million. Again, this applies to spherical geometry and hyperbolic geometry as well as to Euclidean geometry.

Hadwiger's conjecture remains unproven for all dimensions greater than five.

== Consequences ==
Every convex polytope may be dissected into simplexes. Therefore, if Hadwiger's conjecture is true, every convex polytope would also have a dissection into orthoschemes.

A related result is that every orthoscheme can itself be dissected into $d$ or $d+1$ smaller orthoschemes. Therefore, for simplexes that can be partitioned into orthoschemes, their dissections can have arbitrarily large numbers of orthoschemes.
