= Voorhuis (painting) =

17th-century Dutch art genre

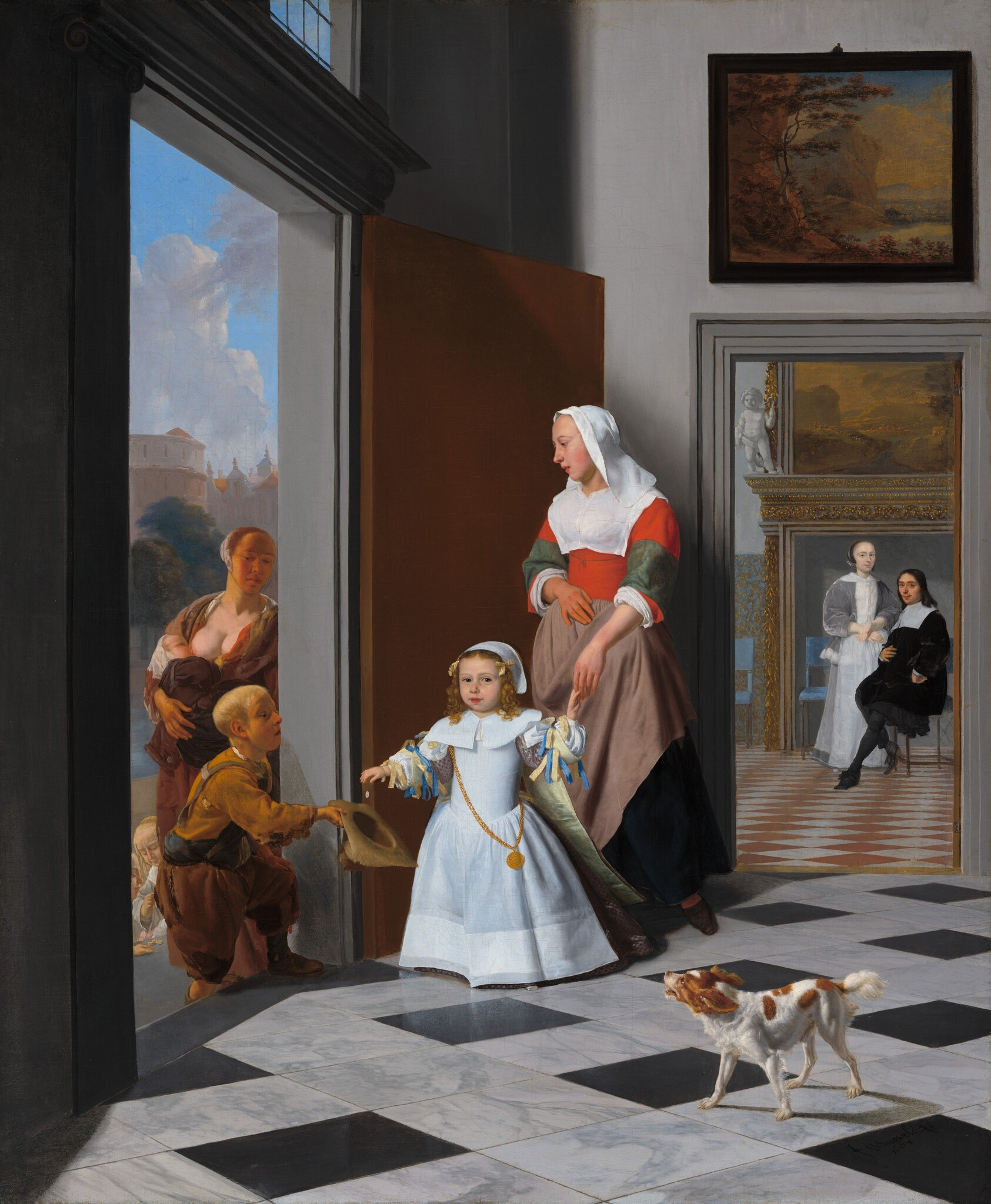
A Nurse and a Child in an Elegant Foyer (1665) by Jacob Ochtervelt (National Gallery of Art, London)

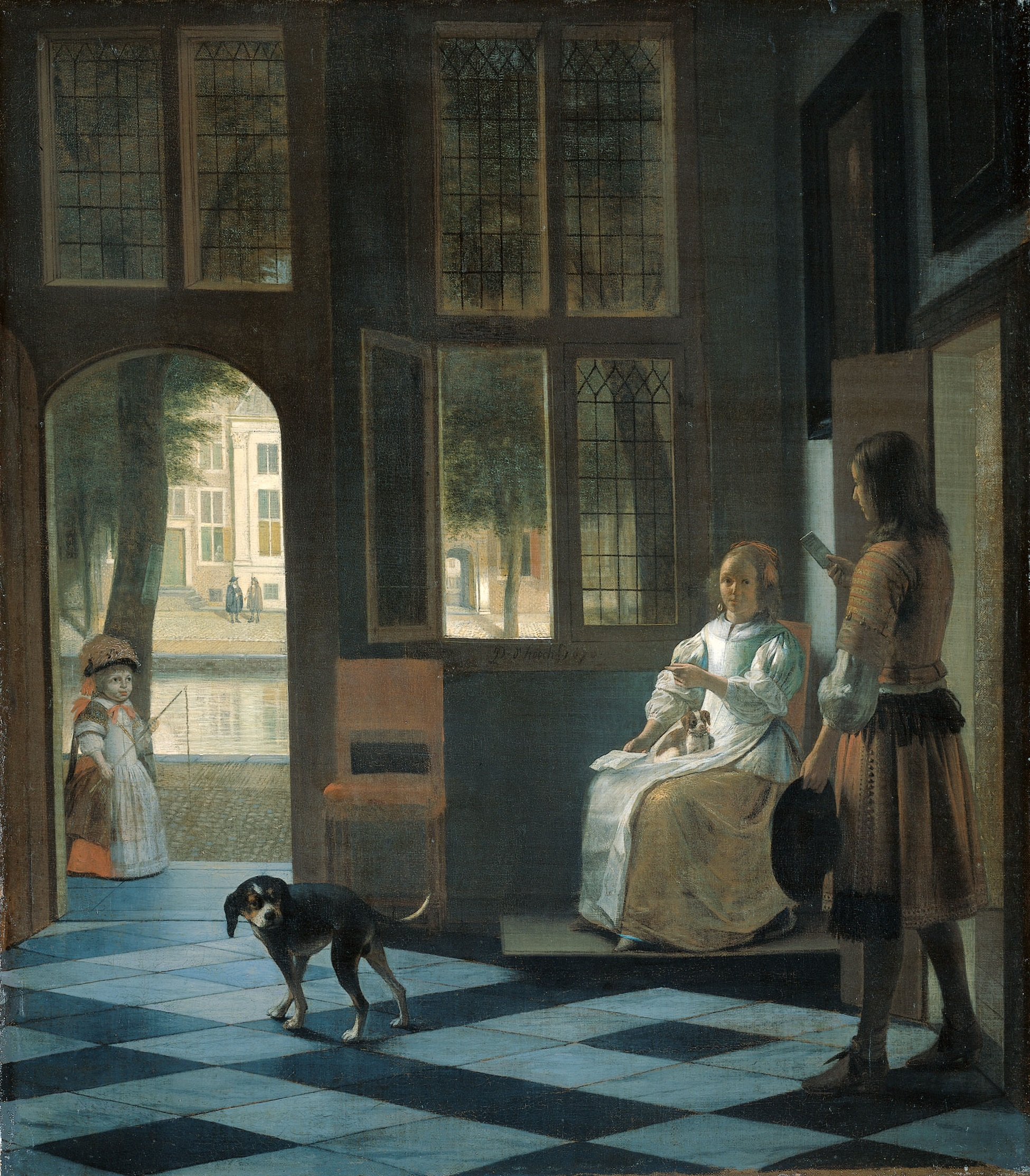
Het Binnenhuis, also known as Young Woman with a Letter and a Messenger in an Interior, by Pieter de Hooch (1670)

Voorhuis painting (English: entrance hall painting) was a Dutch painting genre of the 17th century, typically portraying a view from inside a wealthy house with affluent residents interacting with patrons on the outside through the front doorway. Voorhuis describes a front room, vestibule, or foyer in Dutch.

The style may have developed as a result of the "good light" which streamed through the front windows of a house, while the side walls of Dutch townhouses were often windowless.

Jacob Ochtervelt was a key artist of the movement. Many of Ochtervelt's voorhuis pictures illustrated the trade between residents and local peddlers and food vendors. Het Binnenhuis by Pieter de Hooch is considered an excellent example of the voorhuis style.
