= Commission for Looted Art in Europe =

Non-profit organization

The Commission for Looted Art in Europe is a non-profit organization, that researches looted art, and helps formulate restitution policy, for galleries, libraries, archives, and museums.

It was organized in 1999. Anne Webber, and David Lewis are co-chairs.

In 2011, they joined with the UK National Archives, the U.S. National Archives and Records Administration, and German Federal Archives to create a single web portal of stolen art.

== Recovery ==
In 2006 the BBC foreign correspondent Sir Charles Wheeler returned an original Alessandro Allori painting to the Gemäldegalerie, Berlin. He had been given it in Germany in 1952, but only recently realized its origin and that it must have been looted in the wake of World War II. The work is possibly a portrait of Eleonora (Dianora) di Toledo de' Medici, niece of Eleonora di Toledo, and measures 12 cm × 16 cm.
