= Harold Samuel, Baron Samuel of Wych Cross =

British businessman (1912–1987)

Harold Samuel

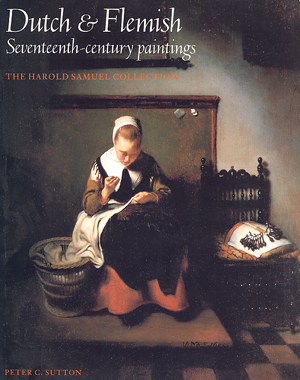
Nicolaes Maes, Young Woman Sewing, 1655, from the Samuel collection on the cover of the catalogue prepared by Peter C. Sutton.

Harold Samuel, Baron Samuel of Wych Cross (23 April 1912 – 28 August 1987) was the British founder of Land Securities, one of the United Kingdom's largest property companies.

== Early life and family ==
Born in Finchley in north London and educated at Mill Hill School and the College of Estate Management at Lincoln's Inn Fields, Harold Samuel initially trained to be a surveyor.

He married Edna Nedas in September 1936 and they went on to have three daughters.

== Career ==
He established himself as an estate agent but in 1944 acquired Land Securities Investment Trust, a small property concern owning three modest properties. After World War II he focused on securing bomb sites in Plymouth, Exeter, Hull, Coventry and Bristol and redeveloping them. He built the business into one of the largest companies on the London Stock Exchange.

He was knighted in 1963 and was created a Life Peer on 3 July 1972 taking the title Baron Samuel of Wych Cross, of Wych Cross in the County of Sussex.

He is often credited with coining the tricolon expression "location, location, location", but the phrase was already in common use when he was still quite young.

== Other interests ==
Harold Samuel was an avid art collector. His collection of Dutch paintings, formed for him with the help of the dealer Edward Speelman, was donated to the Mansion House Art Collection by his wife after his death and subsequently displayed at the Barbican and toured the United States while the Mansion House was being renovated. A catalogue of the collection was prepared by Peter C. Sutton and published by Cambridge University Press to accompany the exhibition.

Samuel also became a fellow of Magdalene College, Cambridge, and University College, London.

== Death ==
Samuel died in 1987.

== Arms ==
Coat of arms of Harold Samuel, Baron Samuel of Wych Cross
Crest In front of a demi-sun Or a house martin wings addorsed Proper. Escutcheon Argent a bend Gules masoned Or between two masons' trowels bendwise Proper on a chief Vert a balance Or. Supporters On either side an old man Proper bearded in flowing robes Argent and shod with sandals that to the dexter holding in the exterior hand a horn of oil Proper lid and virols Or that to the sinister holding beneath the exterior arm two scrolls Proper. Motto Security In The Land
