= Jacob Ochtervelt =

Dutch Golden Age painter (1634–1682)

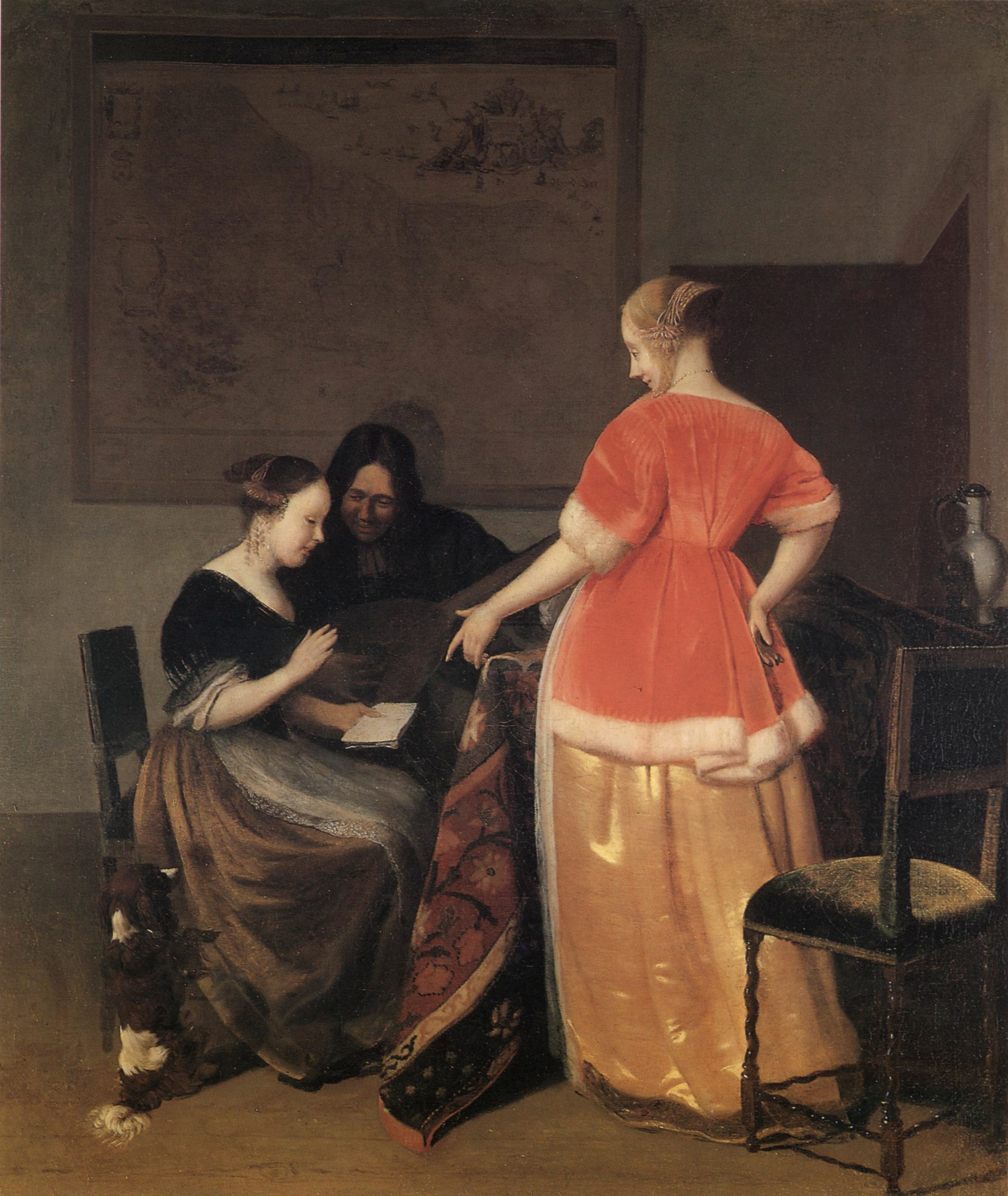
Music lesson, 1667

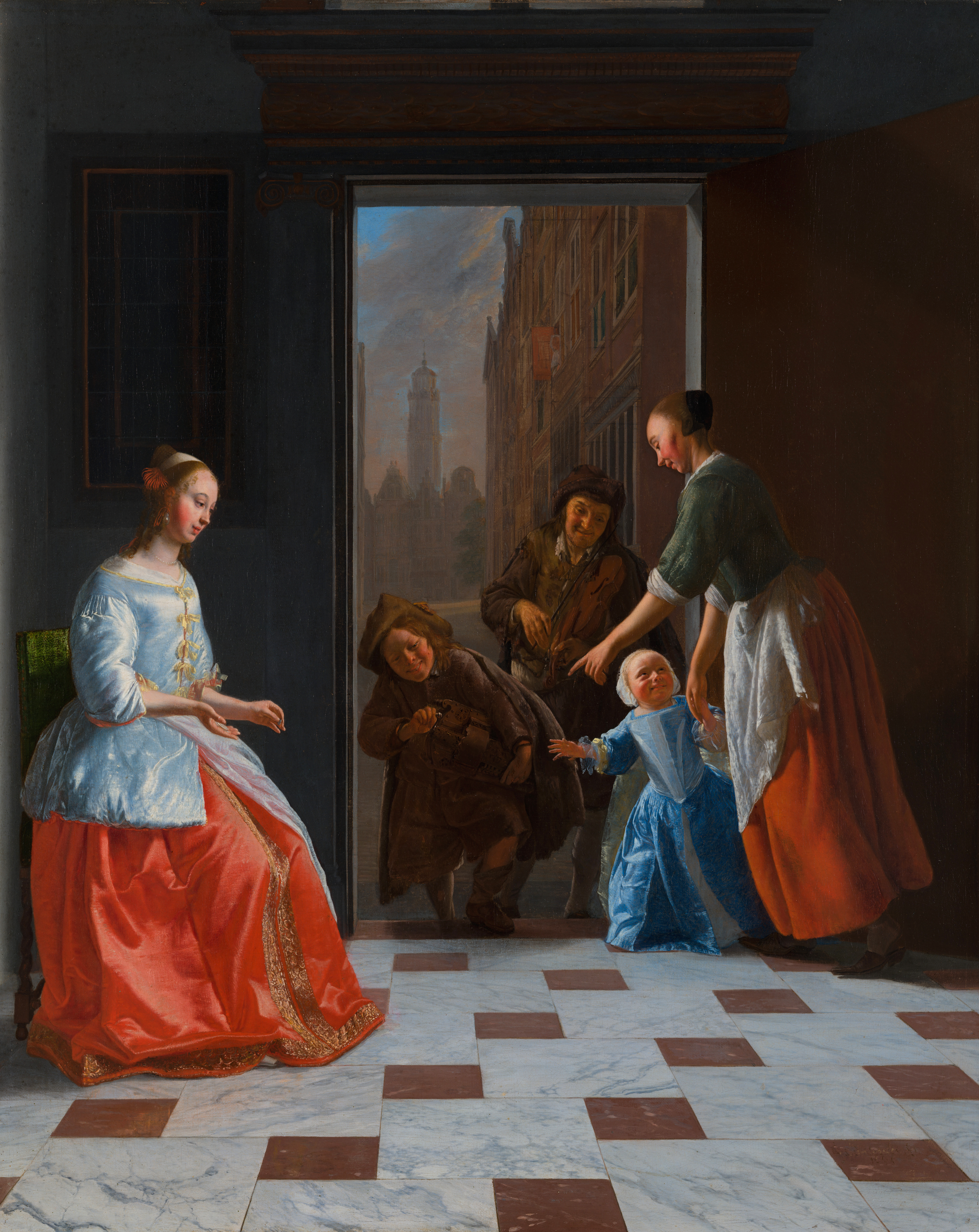
Street Musicians at the Door, 1665, in the collection of the Saint Louis Art Museum

Jacob Ochtervelt (1634–1682) was a Dutch Golden Age painter.

== Biography ==
Ochtervelt's contemporaries included Vermeer, Ter Borch, and De Hooch. Despite his prolific work, he was ignored by the three major 17th century art bibliographers, Andre Felibien, Jochaim Sandrart, and R. de Piles. He was first mentioned by Arnold Houbraken, a biographer of Dutch Golden Age painters, who wrote that "Jakob Ugtervelt was a pupil of N. Berchem during the same period as "Pieter de Hooge" (Hooch), who was famed for his interior conversation pieces with lords and ladies, but without much perspective in his backgrounds, which takes a certain amount of mathematical insight and skill." The way this comment was written leaves the reader questioning whether Houbraken thought Hooch or Ochtervelt painted perspective poorly. According to Abraham Jacob van der Aa's later biography of him, his style was more in keeping with Gerard Terburg or Gabriel Metzu, and in addition to sharing Berchem's studio with Hooch, he had been a pupil of Frans van Mieris the Elder.

According to the Netherlands Institute for Art History, he was active in Haarlem where he was a student of Nicolaes Pietersz Berchem and later he moved back to Rotterdam (1655–1672) where he was a pupil of Ludolf de Jongh (who also taught Pieter de Hooch). After the 1672 disaster year he moved to Amsterdam and lived near Mint tower. He was buried in Nieuwezijds Kapel.

== See also ==
- Voorhuis painting
