= Dissection problem =

Geometric problems involving the partition of a figure

In geometry, a dissection problem is the problem of partitioning a geometric figure (such as a polytope or ball) into smaller pieces that may be rearranged into a new figure of equal content. In this context, the partitioning is called simply a dissection (of one polytope into another). It is usually required that the dissection use only a finite number of pieces. Additionally, to avoid set-theoretic issues related to the Banach–Tarski paradox and Tarski's circle-squaring problem, the pieces are typically required to be well-behaved. For instance, they may be restricted to being the closures of disjoint open sets.

== Polygon dissection problem ==
Proof without words that the area of the parallelogram is the absolute value of the determinant of the 2×2 matrix formed by the vectors representing the parallelogram's sides, by dissection and rearrangement

The Bolyai–Gerwien theorem states that any polygon may be dissected into any other polygon of the same area, using interior-disjoint polygonal pieces. It is not true, however, that any polyhedron has a dissection into any other polyhedron of the same volume using polyhedral pieces (see Dehn invariant). This process is possible, however, for any two honeycombs (such as cube) in three dimension and any two zonohedra of equal volume (in any dimension).

A partition into triangles of equal area is called an equidissection. Most polygons cannot be equidissected, and those that can often have restrictions on the possible numbers of triangles. For example, Monsky's theorem states that there is no odd equidissection of a square.

== Equilateral-triangle squaring problem ==
Four-piece hinged dissection of an equilateral triangle into a square

Among dissection puzzles, an example is the Haberdasher's Puzzle, posed by puzzle writer Henry Dudeney in 1902. It seeks a dissection from equilateral triangle into a square. Dudeney provided a hinged dissection with four pieces. In 2024, Erik Demaine, Tonan Kamata, and Ryuhei Uehara published a preprint claiming to prove that no dissection with fewer pieces exists. This work was selected as one of Scientific American's "The 10 Biggest Math Breakthroughs of 2025."。

== See also ==
- Hilbert's third problem
