= Brenchley (name) =

Brenchley is a surname. Notable people with the surname include:

- Chaz Brenchley (born 1959), British writer
- Edgar Brenchley (1912–1975), British-Canadian ice hockey player
- Frank Brenchley (1918–2011), British diplomat
- Henry Brenchley (1828–1887), English cricketer
- Julius Brenchley (1816–1873), English explorer, naturalist and author
- Patrick J. Brenchley, British geologist
- Peter Brenchley (1936–1991), Australian rules footballer
- Thomas Brenchley (1822–1894), English cricketer
- Winifred Elsie Brenchley (1883–1953) OBE, FLS, FRES, an agricultural botanist in the U.K.

== See also ==
- Viscounts Monckton of Brenchley
  - Walter Monckton, 1st Viscount Monckton of Brenchley
  - Gilbert Walter Riversdale Monckton, 2nd Viscount Monckton of Brenchley
  - Christopher Monckton, 3rd Viscount Monckton of Brenchley
- Benchley
- Brenchley Furnace, on River Ties, first mentioned in 1574; still operating in 1667.
