= Lord Monckton (disambiguation) =

Christopher Monckton, 3rd Viscount Monckton of Brenchley (born 1952), known as Lord Monckton, is a British public speaker and journalist.

Lord Monckton may also refer to:

- Baron Monckton, a subsidiary title of Viscount Galway from 1887 to 1971
- Viscount Monckton of Brenchley, a hereditary title created in 1957

== See also ==
- Rosa Monckton, Baroness Monckton of Dallington Forest (born 1953), British businesswoman and charity campaigner
