= Disenlightenment =

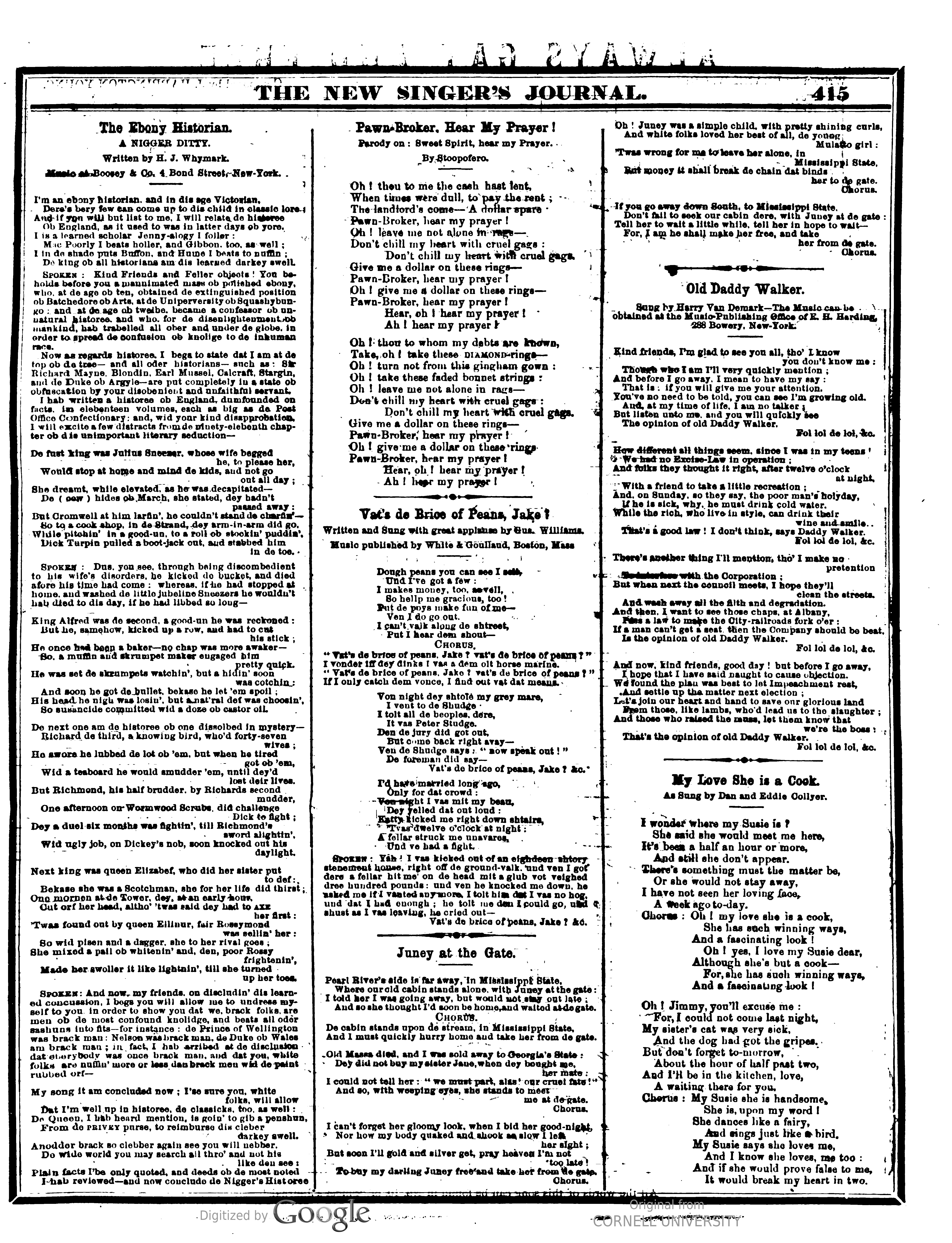
Conflation of "disenlightenment" and "de confusion ob knolige" with notions of race in the lyrics of a nineteenth-century song (from Henry De Marsan's New Comic and Sentimental Singer's Journal No. 56 (1871))

Disenlightenment or the Age of Disenlightenment are terms used by academics and the commentariat critiquing the achievement of the Age of Enlightenment's "promise of emancipatory rationalism", and in relation to concerns as to levels of reading and literacy.

== See also ==
- Relativism
