= Peter Hadfield =

Peter Hadfield may refer to:

- Peter Hadfield (athlete) (born 1955)
- Peter Hadfield (journalist) (born 1954)
