= British Journalism Review =

- Discipline: Journalism
- Language: English
- Edited by: Kim Fletcher

Publication details
- History: 1989–present
- Publisher: SAGE Publications on behalf of BJR Publishing Ltd (United Kingdom)
- Frequency: Quarterly
- Impact factor: (2010)

Standard abbreviations
- ISO 4: Br. Journal. Rev.

Indexing
- ISSN: 0956-4748 (print); 1741-2668 (web)
- LCCN: 92648513
- OCLC no.: 475662491

Links
- Journal homepage; Online access; Online archive

British Journalism Review is a peer-reviewed quarterly academic journal covering the field of journalism. The journal's editor-in-chief is Kim Fletcher. It was established in 1989 and is currently published by SAGE Publications on behalf of BJR Publishing.

== Abstracting and indexing ==
British Journalism Review is abstracted and indexed in:

- Academic Premier
- ComIndex
- Current Contents/Social and Behavioral Sciences
- MasterFILE Premier
- MLA International Bibliography
- Social Sciences Citation Index
- Zetoc

== Coverage ==
Roy Greenslade, board member of the British Journalism highlighted its importance as a journal in December 2012 that in its founding issue, then editor, Geoffrey Goodman said: "No party political axes to grind; no vested interests to protect; no preconceived views - except the conviction that good journalism is not an elitist concern, and that Britain deserves higher standards than it is now getting."

He would publish an additional article in 2015 saying: "It is the one place where journalists and academics can come together to assess the editorial output and methodology - the events, the ethics, the problems, the personalities - in a readable format."

In 2003, the former chairman, Bill Hagerty wrote for the Independent about nearly being nearly hoaxed by Joe Flynn as the then assistant editor in his book on the 100th anniversary of the Daily Mirror.

== The Annual Charles Wheeler Award ==
The award for outstanding contribution to broadcast journalism began in 2009 in conjunction with the University of Westminster and was named after the journalist, Charles Wheeler, the late BBC news foreign correspondent with the award being presented by his family and most recently his daughters, Marina and Shirin.

Wheeler was described by Jeremy Paxman as: ""He never succumbed to pomposity; he never succumbed to self-importance; and he never succumbed to managerialism. "He never softened; he never gave in; he kept going. He remained to the end a straightforward, charming, upright, honorable and awkward bugger.""

The Charles Wheeler Award
Year	Winner
2009	Jeremy Paxman
2010	Jeremy Bowen
2011	Lindsey Hilsum
2012	Allan Little
2013	Robin Lustig
2014	Jon Snow
2015	Alex Crawford
2016	George Alagiah
2017	Lyse Doucet
2019	Katya Adler
2020	Hugh Pym
2021	No award due to COVID-19
2022	Matt Frei
2023	Christiane Amanpour
2024	Mishal Husain
2025	

== The Cudlipp Award ==
The award established in 1999 is for campaigning and investigative journalism and is named after the late Lord Cudlipp, who edited the Daily Mirror in the 1950s and 1960s and is presented in conjunction with the Society of Editors.

== See also ==
- History of journalism in the United Kingdom
