= Parliamentary sketch writing =

The art of parliamentary sketch writing has been a tradition of British parliamentary life since the early 18th century. At that time, there were parliamentary restrictions on how the business of the House of Commons could be reported, and upon reporting on the Members of Parliament associated with the events. Members of the public could watch from the gallery, but space was restricted. Thus, some writers took to giving the MPs pseudonyms, and placing them in made up contexts, cryptically to inform the public. These reports soon became humorous, and started to be referred to as sketches. Nowadays, the tradition persists, in spite of televised coverage of the House of Commons, and these sketches are published daily in The Times, The Independent, The Guardian and The Daily Telegraph.

== Notable sketch writers ==
=== 18th century ===
- Samuel Johnson

=== 19th century ===
- Thomas Barnes
- Henry Lucy
- William White

=== 20th century ===
- Andrew Alexander
- Andrew Gimson
- Simon Hoggart
- Frank Johnson
- Quentin Letts
- Matthew Parris

=== 21st century ===
- Craig Brown
- John Crace
- Michael Deacon
- Patrick Kidd
