= The Home That 2 Built =

The Home That 2 Built is a British television documentary series that aired on BBC Two in November and December 2014. The series looked back at British lifestyle television programmes shown on the channel from across the decades, with episodes on the 1960s, 1970s, 1980s, 1990s and the 2000s.

== Reception ==
Michael Deacon in The Telegraph praised that show for containing interesting information, but criticised the programme for being too light hearted at times.
