= Frank Johnson (journalist) =

English journalist (1943-2006)

- Born: Frank Robert Johnson; 20 January 1943; London, England
- Died: 15 December 2006 (aged 63); London, England
- Occupation: Journalist
- Years active: 1960–2006
- Spouse: Virginia Fraser (m. 1998)

Frank Robert Johnson (20 January 1943 – 15 December 2006) was an English journalist and editor.

== Education ==
Johnson was born to a working class family in London. He was raised in Stoke Newington, and lived mostly at the family home into his thirties. He failed his 11-plus examination, and was educated at a state secondary school in Shoreditch, which he left at the age of 16. Unlike many senior journalists of his time, he did not have a background in further or higher education, and instead, had taken a job as a 'messenger' on a national newspaper.

== Career ==
Johnson began his career in 1960 at the Walthamstow Post, and was a junior reporter at the North-West Evening Mail in Barrow-in-Furness from 1965 to 1966. One of the duties of news staff was to cover sport, which was an unwelcome intrusion into the weekend. Johnson once reported the score of a Barrow rugby league match inaccurately and was robustly criticised by his editor on the Monday morning. However, he never had to cover sport again. Later, Johnson wrote for the Nottingham Evening Post, the Liverpool Echo, The Sun, NOW!, and The Daily Telegraph, where he was a parliamentary sketch writer and leader writer from 1972 to 1979. His writing was known for its humour and turns of phrase, and he is credited with coining the phrase "chattering classes". Two books of his writings were published, Out of Order (1982) and Election Year (1983).

He wrote for The Times as a parliamentary sketch writer, then as a foreign correspondent in Paris and Bonn, from 1981 to 1988, before moving to The Sunday Telegraph as a columnist and editor from 1988 to 1995. He was the editor of the conservative Spectator magazine from 1995 to 1999, before returning to The Daily Telegraph.

== Personal life ==
Johnson was an Anglican. He married Virginia Fraser, the widow of Simon Fraser, Master of Lovat, in 1998. He died from cancer at Chelsea and Westminster Hospital on 15 December 2006, aged 63. Though his declining health led him to step down as the Telegraph's sketch writer, he remained as a columnist for the paper, and wrote until the week of his death. He was cremated and his ashes were scattered in the south of France, where he and his wife owned a home.

Media offices
Preceded by ?	Deputy Editor of the Sunday Telegraph; 1994–1995	Succeeded by Kim Fletcher
Preceded by Dominic Lawson	Editor of The Spectator; 1995–1999	Succeeded by Boris Johnson
