= Sarah Sands =

British journalist and author (born 1961)

- Born: Sarah Harvey; 3 May 1961 (age 65); Royal Tunbridge Wells, Kent, England
- Education: Goldsmiths College, University of London
- Occupations: Journalist; editor; novelist
- Employer: BBC
- Known for: Editor, BBC Radio 4 Today (May 2017 – Sept. 2020); Editor, London Evening Standard (March 2012 – May 2017); Deputy Editor, London Evening Standard (Feb. 2009 – Mar. 2012); Editor-in-Chief, Reader's Digest (Feb. 2008 – Feb. 2009); Consultant Editor, Daily Mail (Apr. 2006 – Feb. 2008); Editor, The Sunday Telegraph (Jun. 2005 – Mar. 2006); Deputy Editor, The Daily Telegraph (1996–2005)
- Spouse(s): Julian Sands (m. 1984; div. 1987) Kim Fletcher
- Children: 3
- Family: Kit Hesketh-Harvey (brother)

Sarah Sands (née Harvey; born 3 May 1961) is a British journalist and author, a former newspaper and BBC Radio 4, Today programme editor who has gone on to serve on multiple boards, mainly in the UK creative and scientific sector, including Channel 4 and the Science Museum Group. She is a former chair of the G7 Gender Equality Advisory Council (GEAC) and has championed the cause of Afghan women.

She is an honorary fellow at Lucy Cavendish College, Cambridge and Goldsmiths, University of London.

== Early life and education ==
Sands was born in Cambridge, in 1961, to parents in the overseas civil service. Sands is the younger sister of Kit Hesketh-Harvey, of musical duo Kit and The Widow. She was educated at Kent College in Pembury, on the outskirts of Tunbridge Wells in Kent, then a Methodist, now interdenominational, boarding and day independent school for girls. She later attended Goldsmiths, University of London.

== Career ==
Sands trained on The Sevenoaks Chronicle as a news reporter, before moving to the Evening Standard, initially as editor of the Londoner's Diary, before taking further posts as features editor and associate editor. She joined The Daily Telegraph in 1996 as deputy editor, under Charles Moore, later assuming responsibility for the Saturday edition.

Sands was appointed editor of The Sunday Telegraph in June 2005, succeeding Dominic Lawson. She was the first woman to hold the post. Her plan for the paper's November 2005 relaunch was that it should be "like an iPod – full of your favourite things". However, the makeover was not well regarded by senior management, and in an abrupt move, after just eight months and 20 days in post, Sands was sacked as editor of the newspaper on 7 March 2006 by Andrew Neil and replaced by Patience Wheatcroft. Subsequently, many of her changes under her editorship were reversed (including changes to the title font).

In April 2006, Sands was appointed consultant editor on the Daily Mail.

In February 2008 she was appointed editor-in-chief of the UK edition of Reader's Digest. In February 2009 it was announced that she would be taking up the role of deputy editor on London Evening Standard. She became editor of the London Evening Standard following Geordie Greig's departure for The Mail on Sunday in March 2012.

In January 2017, she was appointed editor of the BBC Radio 4 Today programme and took up her appointment later in the year. Sands resigned from the post in late January 2020, the day after major cuts to BBC News were announced.

As an editor and columnist, Sands concentrated on politics and current affairs, and was known for her pursuit of stories and sense of mischief but in later years became more interested in nature and faith. She is currently the CEO of Hymns Ancient & Modern .

Sands was the Chair of the G7 gender equality advisory council in 2021 and was invited back to sit on the council in 2022, 2023 and 2024. She was the former Deputy Chair of the British Council and acting Chair in 2023. She is a Trustee of the British Pilgrimage Trust, On The Record memorial for journalists killed in conflict zones, the Science Museum, Bletchley Park and John Innes Centre research institute in Norwich and sits on the board of the Berkeley Group and Channel 4. She was a Partner at Hawthorn Advisors and on the board of Walpole. She is an ambassador for Global Partnership for Education, an Associate at the IWM, former Trustee of Index on Censorship and co-founded the Braemar Summit in 2021.

Sands is an honorary fellow of Goldsmiths, University of London, Lucy Cavendish College, Cambridge and a visiting fellow to the Reuters Institute. She has written four novels: her most recent books are Constellations and Consolations (2024), The Hedgehog Diaries (2023), Search of the Queen of Sheba (2022) and The Interior Silence: 10 Lessons from Monastic Life (2021).

== Personal life ==
Sands's first marriage was to the actor Julian Sands, with whom she had a son; the couple divorced in 1987.

Her second marriage was to Kim Fletcher, a former editorial director of the Telegraph group and editor of The Independent on Sunday, with whom she has two children.

Media offices
| Preceded by Simon Heffer and Veronica Wadley | Deputy Editor of The Daily Telegraph; 1995–2005 | Succeeded by Neil Darbyshire and William Lewis |
| Preceded by Dominic Lawson | Editor of The Sunday Telegraph; 2005–2006 | Succeeded by Patience Wheatcroft |
| Preceded by Andrew Bordiss | Deputy Editor of the Evening Standard; 2009–2012 | Succeeded by Ian Walker |
| Preceded by Geordie Greig | Editor of the Evening Standard; 2012–2017 | Succeeded by George Osborne |
| Preceded by Jamie Angus | Editor of Today; 2017–2020 | Succeeded by Owenna Griffiths |
