= Christopher Monckton, 3rd Viscount Monckton of Brenchley =

British peer (born 1952)

The Right Honourable The Viscount Monckton of Brenchley
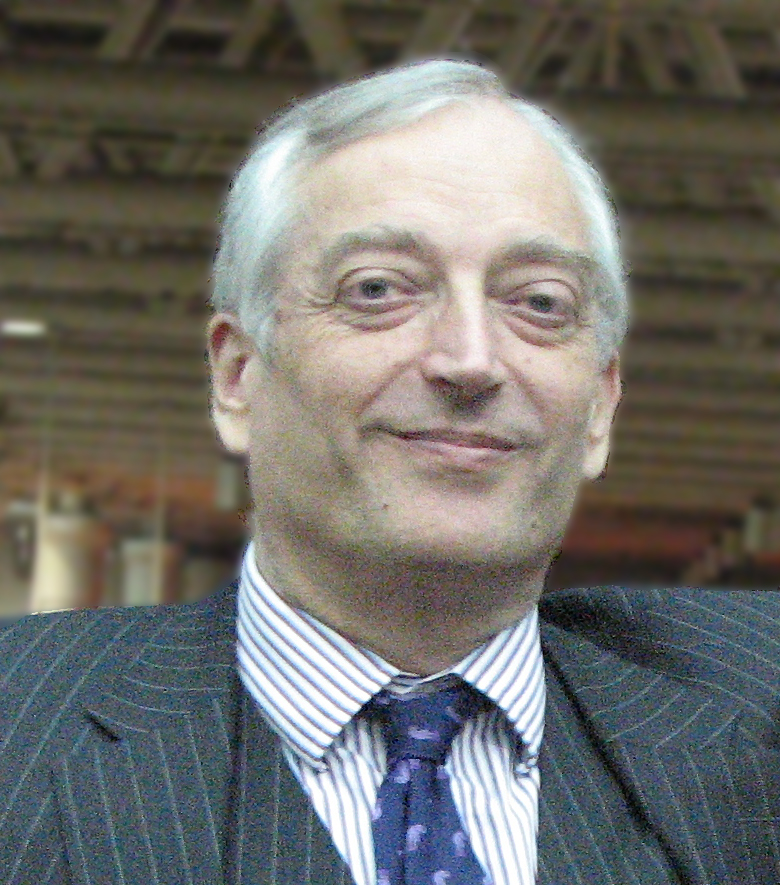
- Monckton in 2009

Deputy Leader of the UK Independence Party
- In office 3 June 2010 – 8 November 2010
- Leader: The Lord Pearson of Rannoch; Nigel Farage
- Preceded by: David Campbell Bannerman
- Succeeded by: Paul Nuttall

Leader of the Scottish UK Independence Party
- In office 10 January 2013 – 1 December 2013
- Leader: Nigel Farage
- Preceded by: The Lord Pearson of Rannoch
- Succeeded by: David Coburn

Personal details
- Born: 14 February 1952 (age 74)
- Party: Conservative (before 2009); UKIP (2009–present)
- Spouse: Juliet Mary Anne Malherbe Jensen
- Parent(s): Gilbert Monckton; Marianna Letitia Bower
- Relatives: Rosa Monckton (sister)
- Education: MA in classics, 1974; diploma in journalism studies
- Alma mater: Churchill College, Cambridge; University College, Cardiff
- Occupation: Politician, journalist

Christopher Walter Monckton, 3rd Viscount Monckton of Brenchley (born 14 February 1952) is a British public speaker and hereditary peer. He is known for his work as a journalist, Conservative political advisor, UKIP political candidate, and climate denier and for his invention of the mathematical puzzle Eternity.

Early on in his public speaking career topics centred on his mathematical puzzle and conservative politics. In recent years, his public speaking has garnered attention due to his denial of climate change and his views on the European Union and social policy.

== Personal life ==
Monckton is the eldest son of Major-General Gilbert Monckton, 2nd Viscount Monckton of Brenchley (1915–2006), and Marianna Letitia, Viscountess Monckton of Brenchley (née Bower; 1929–2022), one-time High Sheriff of Kent and Dame of Malta. He has three brothers, Timothy, Jonathan and Anthony, and a sister, Rosa, Baroness Monckton of Dallington Forest, wife of journalist Dominic Lawson.

Monckton was educated at Harrow School and Churchill College, Cambridge, where he received a B.A. (Classics, 1974, now M.A.), and at University College, Cardiff, where he obtained a diploma in journalism studies. In 1990, he married Juliet Mary Anne Malherbe Jensen.

Monckton is a liveryman of the Worshipful Company of Broderers, an Officer of the Order of St John of Jerusalem, a Knight of Honour and Devotion of the Sovereign Military Order of Malta, and a member of the Roman Catholic Mass Media Commission. He is also a qualified Day Skipper with the Royal Yachting Association, and has been a trustee of the Hales Trophy for the Blue Riband of the Atlantic since 1986.

On the death of his father in 2006 Monckton inherited the title Viscount Monckton of Brenchley, but owing to the House of Lords Act 1999 he did not gain a seat in the House of Lords.

== Career ==
=== Journalism ===
Monckton joined the Yorkshire Post in 1974 at the age of 22, where he worked as a reporter and leader-writer. From 1977 to 1978, he worked at Conservative Central Office as a press officer, becoming the editor of the Roman Catholic newspaper The Universe in 1979, then managing editor of The Sunday Telegraph magazine in 1981. He joined the London Evening Standard newspaper as a leader-writer in 1982. After a hiatus in his career as a journalist Monckton became assistant editor of the newly established, and now defunct, tabloid newspaper Today in 1986. He was a consulting editor for the Evening Standard from 1987 to 1992 and was its chief leader-writer from 1990 to 1992.

Since 2002 Monckton has had several newspaper articles published critical of the IPCC and scientific consensus on climate change.

=== Entrepreneurship ===
In 1995, Monckton and his wife opened Monckton's, a shirt shop in King's Road, Chelsea.

In 1999, Monckton created and published the Eternity puzzle, a geometric puzzle that involved tiling a dodecagon with 209 irregularly shaped polygons called "polydrafters". A £1 million prize was won after 18 months by two Cambridge mathematicians. By that time, 500,000 puzzles had been sold. Monckton launched the Eternity II puzzle in 2007, but, after the four-year prize period, no winner came forward to claim the $2 million prize.

Monckton is a director of Resurrexi Pharmaceutical. It asserts it is "responsible for invention and development of a broad-spectrum cure for infectious diseases." In the BBC documentary, "Meet the Sceptics" (2011), he claimed to have cured himself of Graves' disease. UKIP's CV for Monckton claims that his methods have produced cures for multiple sclerosis, influenza, and herpes, as well as reducing the viral load of an HIV patient. In an interview with Australia's Radio National, Monckton said that his methods had had some initial successes but "we cannot claim that we can cure anything".

=== Political career ===
==== Political advisor to the Conservative Party ====
In 1979, Monckton met Alfred Sherman, who co-founded the pro-Conservative think tank the Centre for Policy Studies (CPS) with Margaret Thatcher and Keith Joseph in 1974. Sherman asked Monckton to take the minutes at the CPS's study group meetings. Monckton subsequently became the secretary for the centre's economic, forward strategy, health and employment study groups. He wrote a paper on the privatisation of council housing by means of a rent-to-mortgages scheme that brought him to the attention of Downing Street. Ferdinand Mount, the head of the Number 10 Policy Unit and a former CPS director, brought Monckton into the Policy Unit in 1982. He was recruited as a domestic specialist with responsibilities for housing and parliamentary affairs, working alongside Mount and Peter Shipley on projects such as the phasing out of council housing. He left the unit in 1986 to join the Today newspaper.

Monckton has said that he served as science adviser to Prime Minister Margaret Thatcher during his years with the Number 10 Policy Unit, and that "it was I who—on the prime minister's behalf—kept a weather eye on the official science advisers to the government, from the chief scientific adviser downward." John Gummer, who was Environment Minister under Thatcher said Monckton was "a bag carrier in Mrs Thatcher's office. And the idea that he advised her on climate change is laughable." Writing in The Guardian, Bob Ward of the Grantham Research Institute on Climate Change and the Environment notes that Thatcher's memoirs, The Downing Street Years, do not mention Monckton and refer to George Guise as her science advisor.

==== Standing in by-elections for the House of Lords ====
Monckton inherited a peerage after the passing of the House of Lords Act 1999, which provided that "[n]o-one shall be a member of the House of Lords by virtue of a hereditary peerage".

Monckton stood unsuccessfully in four by-elections for vacant seats created by deaths among the 92 hereditary peers remaining in the Lords after the 1999 reforms. He first stood for a Conservative seat in a March 2007 by-election, and was among 31 of 43 candidates who received no votes. He subsequently stood in the crossbench by-elections of May 2008, July 2009, and June 2010, again receiving no votes. He was highly critical of the way the Lords was reformed, describing the procedure in the March 2007 by-election, with 43 candidates and 47 electors, as "a bizarre constitutional abortion."

==== Spokesperson and candidate for UK Independence Party ====
Monckton joined the UK Independence Party (UKIP) in 2009 and became its chief spokesperson on climate change. At the 2010 general election he was nominated as the UKIP candidate for the Scottish constituency of Perth and North Perthshire; although a hereditary peer, he was entitled to stand for election for the House of Commons as he is not a member of the House of Lords. He subsequently withdrew in accordance with UKIP's policy of not opposing other Eurosceptic parliamentary candidates. In June 2010, UKIP announced he had been appointed its deputy leader, to serve alongside David Campbell Bannerman under party leader The Lord Pearson of Rannoch, who owns an estate in Scotland adjoining Monckton's. He was succeeded in the role of deputy leader by Paul Nuttall in November 2010.

In 2011 he stood as lead party-list candidate for UKIP in the Scottish Parliament constituency of Mid Scotland and Fife but did not gain election, with the UKIP list coming seventh after scoring 1.1% of the region's vote. Monckton also headed UKIP's policy unit for a while but according to the party's spokesman he had relinquished any formal role by June 2012, moving into a "semi-detached" relationship with UKIP. By January 2013 he had become UKIP's president in Scotland but was sacked by UKIP leader Nigel Farage in November 2013 following factional infighting.

=== Public speaking ===
Since 2008 he has toured Britain, Ireland, the US, China, Canada, India, Colombia, South Africa, and Australia delivering talks to groups related to the subject of Climate Change. As the Chief Policy Adviser for the US lobby group Science and Public Policy Institute he appeared at the Heartland Institute's 2008 "International Conference on Climate Change".

In 2009–10 he was invited on four occasions before Congress to testify by Republican representatives. On 25 March 2009 he appeared before the U.S. House Subcommittee on Energy and Environment, and in 2010 before the House Select Committee on Energy Independence and Global Warming invited by Jim Sensenbrenner. He followed this up with his January 2010 and July 2011 tours of Australia and New Zealand, as well as tours of China and India in December 2011. He was invited again to the US in 2012 by Republican Shannon Grove to speak before the California State Assembly and later in the year travelling to Australia at the invitation of Democratic Labor Party Senator John Madigan.

On 6 December 2012 Monckton took Burma's seat at the COP18 Climate Change Conference in Doha without permission and made a short speech attacking the idea of man-made climate change. He was escorted from the building and given a lifetime ban from attending UN climate talks. Monckton said that there had been no global warming over the last sixteen years, and thus the science should be reviewed.

Between 2009 and 2010 the film maker Rupert Murray followed Monckton on his climate change tour. The film was later broadcast on 31 January 2011 on BBC Four titled Meet the Sceptics. Prior to its broadcast its depiction of Monckton was described by fellow denialist James Delingpole as "another hatchet job" and Monckton's attempt to gain an injunction failed.

== Dispute over his non-membership of the House of Lords ==
Monckton asserts that the House of Lords Act 1999, that deprived him of a hereditary seat, is flawed and unconstitutional. In 2006 he referred to himself as "a member of the Upper House of the United Kingdom legislature" in a letter to US Senators, and has said he was "a member of the Upper House but without the right to sit or vote." The House of Lords authorities have said Monckton is not and never has been a member and that there is no such thing as a non-voting or honorary member of the House.

In July 2011 the House of Lords took the unprecedented step of publishing online a cease and desist letter to Monckton from the Clerk of the Parliaments, which said: "I must repeat my predecessor's statement that you are not and have never been a Member of the House of Lords." It concluded, "I am publishing this letter on the parliamentary website so that anybody who wishes to check whether you are a Member of the House of Lords can view this official confirmation that you are not."

== Views ==
=== Climate change ===
Monckton advocates for climate change denial, is a policy advisor to The Heartland Institute and has stated that those who warn of the dangers of climate change should be jailed, calling them "bogus". He does say a greenhouse effect exists, and that carbon dioxide contributes to it, but claims there is no "causative link" from CO_{2}-concentration to global average temperature. He said the Stern Review on the Economics of Climate Change underestimated the costs of climate change mitigation and overstated its benefits. Monckton's opinions contradict the scientific opinion on climate change, where there is consensus for anthropogenic global warming, and show a decisive link between carbon dioxide concentration and global average temperatures.

On 18 October 2008 Monckton posted online "More in Sorrow than in Anger, Open letter from The Viscount Monckton of Brenchley to Senator John McCain about Climate Science and Policy" after U.S. presidential candidate John McCain made a campaign speech at a wind farm in which he stated his belief in anthropogenic climate change. Monckton stated in interviews and on the web site of the Science and Public Policy institute that he was a Nobel Peace Prize laureate; he later stated that this had been a joke.

In 2009, John P. Abraham criticized Monckton's claims in a lecture at Bethel University, and Monckton filed disciplinary charges alleging academic dishonesty against Abraham. The University of St Thomas's lawyers wrote to Monckton that "The University of St Thomas respects your right to disagree with Professor Abraham, just as the University respects Professor Abraham's right to disagree with you. What we object to are your personal attacks against Father Dease, and Professor Abraham, your inflammatory language, and your decision to disparage Professor Abraham, Father Dease, and The University of St Thomas." The latter was in response to an interview in which Monckton characterized Abraham as "a wretched little man," the university's president Dease as "a creep," and the University of St. Thomas as "a half-assed Catholic bible college".

Monckton has also been criticised by science journalist and YouTuber Peter Hadfield. On his YouTube channel potholer54 in a series titled "Monckton Bunkum", Hadfield debunked Monckton's claim that the Earth had not been warming based on cherry picking of start and end points of the global temperature record, his claim that climate sensitivity to a doubling of atmospheric carbon dioxide is a third of what it actually is and his confusion of sensitivity with forcing, and his claim that Himalayan glaciers had been stable for the past two centuries. Hadfield also showed how Monckton had misquoted the words of Kevin E. Trenberth, Murari Lau, Sir John Houghton, and Justice Michael Burton of the High Court of Justice, in addition to falsely claiming that the International Astronomical Union had concluded at a 2004 symposium that the Sun was responsible for the majority of recent global warming.

=== Social and economic policy ===
One of Margaret Thatcher's policy advisors, Monckton was credited with being "the brains behind the Thatcherite policy of giving council tenants (public housing) the right to buy their homes." Monckton was a sponsor of the Conservative Family Campaign in the 1990s. Monckton has been associated with the Referendum Party, advising its founder, Sir James Goldsmith. In 2003 he helped a Scottish Tory breakaway group, the Scottish Peoples Alliance.

In 1988, Eddy Shah: Today and the Newspaper Revolution described Monckton as "a fervent, forthright and opinionated Roman Catholic Tory" who has been closely associated with the "New Right" faction of the Conservative Party. In 1997, Monckton criticised works at the Fotofeis (the Scottish International Festival of Photography) and Sensation as "feeble-minded, cheap, pitiable, exploitative sensationalism perpetrated by the talent-free and perpetuated by over-funded, useless, muddle-headed, middle-aged, pot-bellied, brewer's-droopy quangoes which a courageous Government would forthwith cease to subsidise with your money and mine."

=== Statements on AIDS and homosexuality ===
==== American Spectator article on AIDS (1987) ====
In a 1987 article for The American Spectator, "AIDS: A British View", Monckton argued "there is only one way to stop AIDS. That is to screen the entire population regularly and to quarantine all carriers of the disease for life. Every member of the population should be blood-tested every month ... all those found to be infected with the virus, even if only as carriers, should be isolated compulsorily, immediately, and permanently." This would involve isolating between 1.5 and 3 million people in the United States ("not altogether impossible") and another 30,000 people in the UK ("not insuperably difficult"). The article concluded that current Western sensibilities would not allow this standard protocol for containing a new, fatal and incurable infection to be applied: therefore, he said, many would needlessly die. Andrew Ferguson, then assistant managing editor of The American Spectator, denounced it in the letters column of the same issue. Monckton appeared on the BBC's Panorama programme in February 1987 to discuss his views and present the results of an opinion poll that found public support for his position. Monckton has since stated "the article was written at the very outset of the AIDS epidemic, and with 33 million people around the world now infected, the possibility of [quarantine] is laughable. It couldn't work." He also said that this standard protocol could have worked at the time; that senior HIV investigators had called for it; and that many of the lives that have been lost could have been saved.

==== Article on homosexuality (2014) ====
Monckton returned to the subject of homosexuality in a November 2014 article for the WorldNetDaily website describing the campaign of Councillor Rosalie Crestani in the City of Casey, near Melbourne, Australia. In the article, he claims that "official survey after official survey had shown that homosexuals had an average of 500-1,000 partners in their sexually active lifetime, and that some had as many as 20,000." In this article, he used (instead of the actual LGBT initialism) "QWERTYUIOPASDFGHJKLZXCVBNM" — a fanciful and overly-long parody term formed by typing every key on a QWERTY keyboard in order — which he then shortened to "QWERTYs". "That ought to cover every real or imaginary form of sexual deviancy they may dream up," he wrote.

"Now, I'm not sure where Viscount Monckton is getting his statistics," wrote (then) UKIP leader Nigel Farage in The Independent, "but to frame these comments as he has is both deeply offensive and fundamentally wrong."

=== European integration ===
Monckton has been a Eurosceptic, an opponent of European integration. In 1994, he sued the Conservative government of John Major for agreeing to contribute to the costs of the Protocol on Social Policy agreed in the 1993 Maastricht Treaty, although the UK had an opt-out from the protocol. The case was heard in the Scottish Court of Session in May 1994. His petition for judicial review was dismissed by the court for want of relevancy. In a 2007 interview he said he would "leave the European Union, close down 90 per cent of government services and shift power away from the atheistic, humanistic government and into the hands of families and individuals."

== Published works ==
- The Laker Story (with Ivan Fallon). Christensen, 1982. ISBN 0-9508007-0-8
- Anglican Orders: null and void?. Family History Books, 1986.
- The AIDS Report. 1987
- European Monetary Union: opportunities and dangers. University of St. Andrews, Department of Economics. 1997
- Sudoku X. Headline Publishing Group, 2005. ISBN 0-7553-1501-4
- Sudoku X-mas. Headline Publishing Group, 2005. ISBN 0-7553-1502-2
- Sudoku Xpert. Headline Publishing Group, 2006. ISBN 0-7553-1529-4
- Junior Sudoku X. Headline Publishing Group, 2006. ISBN 0-7553-1528-6
- Sudoku Xtreme. Headline Publishing Group, 2006. ISBN 0-7553-1530-8
- "Climate Sensitivity Reconsidered". Forum on Physics and Society, American Physical Society. July 2008.

The Science and Public Policy Institute, of which Monckton is policy director, has published nine non-peer-reviewed articles by Monckton on climate-change science.

== Arms ==
Coat of arms of Christopher Monckton, 3rd Viscount Monckton of Brenchley
Crest A martlet Or. Escutcheon 1st & 4th Sable on a chevron between three martlets Or three mullets Sable (Monckton) 2nd & 3rd Or a chevron Gules a chief Vair (St Quintin). Supporters On either side a horse Argent crined and unguled Or gorged with a chain Gold pendant therefrom an escutcheon Sable charged with a roses also Argent barbed and seeded Proper quartering St Quintin (Gules a chevron Or a chief Vair). Motto Famam Extendere Factis Badge Within an annulet a martlet Or.

Peerage of the United Kingdom
Preceded by Gilbert Monckton	Viscount Monckton of Brenchley; 2006–present	Incumbent
Party political offices
Preceded by David Campbell Bannerman	Deputy Leader of the UK Independence Party; 2010	Succeeded by Paul Nuttall
