= Thomas Brenchley =

English cricketer

Thomas Harman Brenchley (c. 1822 – 19 September 1894) was an English wine merchant and distiller, and a cricketer. He played first-class cricket for Kent County Cricket Club and for the Gentlemen of Kent amateur team between 1848 and 1851.

He was the eldest son of John Brenchley of Wombwell Hall, Northfleet parish, Kent, and his wife Mary Rachel Harman. His birth date is not known, but he was christened at Milton-next-Gravesend in Kent on 7 May 1822. Brenchley died at Glaneirw near Tan-y-groes in Cardiganshire, Wales in 1894.

Brenchley played in 11 first-class matches, scoring a total of 115 runs. He also played matches for Gravesend Cricket Club. His brother Henry played in three first-class matches for Kent between 1854 and 1857.

== Bibliography ==
- Carlaw, Derek (2020). Kent County Cricketers, A to Z: Part One (1806–1914) (PDF). Cardiff: ACS.
