= John Crace (writer) =

British journalist and critic (born 1956)

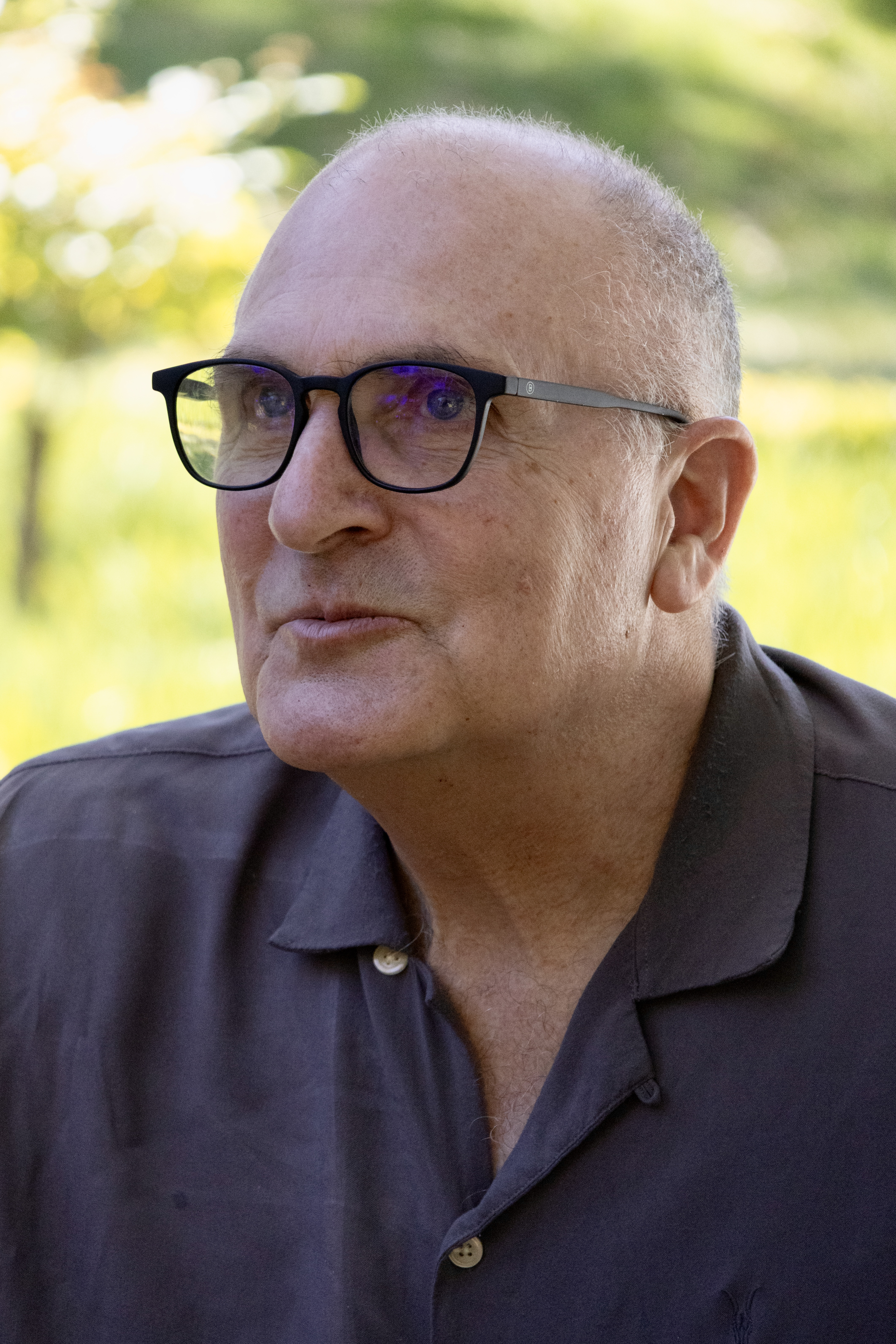
- Crace at the 2025 Adelaide Writers' Week
- Born: 9 October 1956 (age 70)
- Education: University of Exeter
- Occupations: Journalist, critic, parliamentary sketch writer
- Employer: The Guardian

John Crace (/ˈkreɪs/ KRAYSS; born 9 October 1956) is a British journalist and critic. He attended Exeter University. Crace is the parliamentary sketch writer for The Guardian, having replaced the late Simon Hoggart in 2014, and he also writes the paper's occasional "Digested Read" column. Crace is a supporter of Tottenham Hotspur F.C. and has written several books on the club. He blogs for ESPN FC on Tottenham. According to his columns, he is an enthusiastic collector of ceramic pots.

Writing in 2019, Crace described his "cold turkey" rehabilitation from heroin addiction 32 years earlier.

In July 2019, The Guardian retracted statements by Crace implying that right-wing political journalist Isabel Oakeshott had obtained confidential files by having sex with Nigel Farage and Arron Banks. His article included the claim that Oakeshott only got confidential emails if Farage and Banks "slips it to her". Following the threat of legal action by Oakeshott, the text was amended to: "leave it conveniently tucked under her pillow". This second revision was then removed, with the final version stating: "if he or Arron Banks leave it conveniently to one side for her". Oakeshott stated: "It gives me great pleasure to teach John Crace and The Guardian a little lesson about casually slurring women whose politics they dislike".

On 11 March 2024, Crace posted on his X/Twitter account that he had suffered a heart attack and was receiving treatment in St George's Hospital, London. He wrote an article in The Guardian on 21 March 2024, giving more details.

Crace collects British stamps and has written columns for Stamp Magazine.

== Bibliography ==
- Wasim and Waqar: Imran's Inheritors. Boxtree Ltd. 1992.
- The Digested Read. RDR Books. 2006.
- Brideshead Abbreviated: The Digested Read of the Twentieth Century. Random House UK. 2010.
- Vertigo: Spurs, Bale and One Fan's Fear of Success. Constable & Robinson. 2011.
- Harry's Games: Inside the Mind of Harry Redknapp. Constable. 2014.
- The Digested Twenty-first Century. Constable. 2014.
- I, Maybot: The Rise and Fall. Guardian Faber Publishing. 2017. ISBN 978-1783351435.
- Decline and Fail: Read in Case of Political Apocalypse. Guardian Faber Publishing. 2019. ISBN 978-1783351930.
- Farewell to Calm. Guardian Faber Publishing. 2021. ISBN 978-1-78335-244-9.
- Depraved New World: Please Hold, the Government Will Be With You Shortly. Guardian Faber Publishing. 2023. ISBN 978-1-78335-273-9
- Taking the Lead: A Dog at Number 10. Constable. 2024. ISBN 9781408721278.
