= William White (journalist) =

British pamphleteer, born 1807

- Born: 1807
- Died: 11 February 1882 (aged 74–75); Carshalton, Surrey, England
- Education: Bedford School
- Occupations: Pamphleteer and Parliamentary sketch writer

William White (1807 – 11 February 1882), was a 19th-century British pamphleteer and parliamentary sketch writer.

== Biography ==
The character of Zachariah Coleman in Hale White's The Revolution in Tanner’s Lane, published in 1887, "is a tribute to William White... [Zachariah Coleman's] love of Byron, and his admiration for Cobbett, came from William White."

William White died in Carshalton, Surrey, on 11 February 1882.
