= Glaneirw =

Mansion in Ceredigion, Wales

Coordinates: 52.111264°N 4.515858°W

- Location within Ceredigion
- OS grid reference: SN 2782 4887
  - Cardiff: 72 mi (116 km)
  - London: 192 mi (309 km)
- Community: Aberporth
- Principal area: Ceredigion
- Country: Wales
- Sovereign state: United Kingdom
- Post town: Cardigan
- Postcode district: SA43
- Police: Dyfed-Powys
- Fire: Mid and West Wales
- Ambulance: Welsh
- UK Parliament: Ceredigion Preseli
- Senedd Cymru – Welsh Parliament: Ceredigion

Glaneirw is an old mansion in the community of Aberporth, Ceredigion, Wales, which is 72 miles (115.8 km) from Cardiff and 192 miles (309 km) from London. Glaneirw is represented in the Senedd by Elin Jones (Plaid Cymru) and is part of the Ceredigion Preseli constituency in the House of Commons.

== See also ==
- List of localities in Wales by population
