= Benchley =

Benchley is a surname. Notable people with the surname include:

- Henry Wetherby Benchley (1822–1867), American politician
- Nat Benchley (21st century), American actor
- Nathaniel Benchley (1915–1981), American author
- Peter Benchley (1940–2006), American author
- Robert Benchley (1889–1945), American humorist

== Other ==
- Benchley, satirical comic strip created by Mort Drucker and Jerry Dumas.
