= Viscount Monckton of Brenchley =

Viscountcy in the Peerage of the United Kingdom

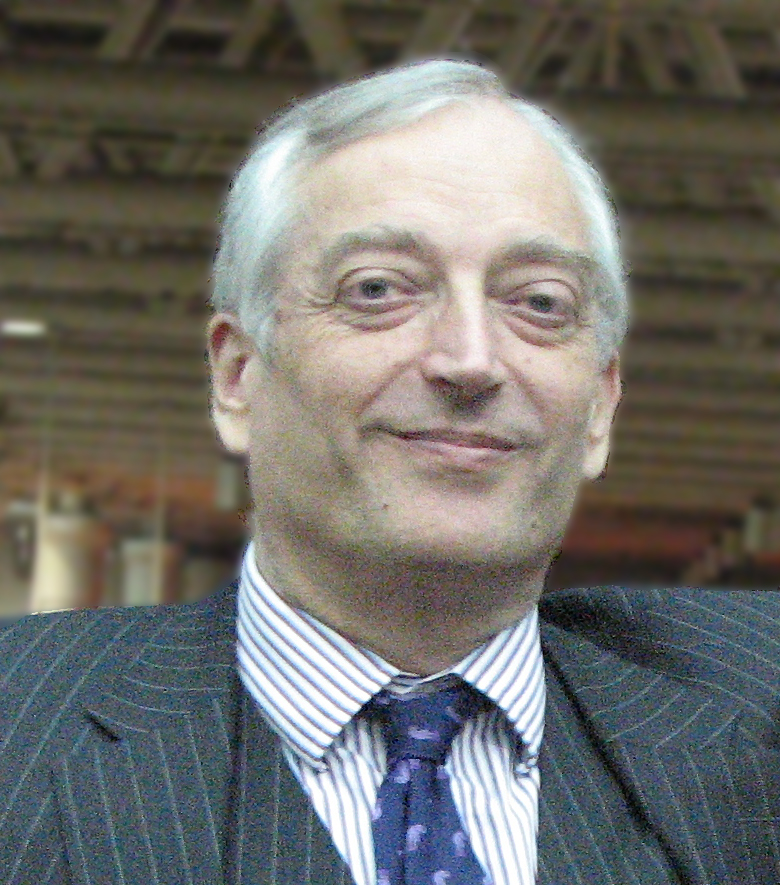
Christopher Monckton, 3rd Viscount Monckton of Brenchley.

Viscount Monckton of Brenchley, of Brenchley in the County of Kent, is a hereditary title in the Peerage of the United Kingdom. It was created on 11 February 1957 for the lawyer, Conservative politician and former Minister of Defence, Sir Walter Monckton. His son, the second viscount, was a major-general in the British Army. As of 2018 the title is held by the latter's eldest son, the third viscount, who succeeded in 2006. He is a journalist known for his denial of climate change, for his work for The Heartland Institute and as the creator of the Eternity puzzle.

Rosa Monckton, Baroness Monckton of Dallington Forest, a life peer, is the only daughter of the second viscount and a sister of the present viscount.

== Viscounts Monckton of Brenchley (1957) ==
- Walter Turner Monckton, 1st Viscount Monckton of Brenchley (1891–1965)
- Gilbert Walter Riversdale Monckton, 2nd Viscount Monckton of Brenchley (1915–2006)
- Christopher Walter Monckton, 3rd Viscount Monckton of Brenchley (b. 1952)

The heir presumptive is the present holder's brother the Hon. Timothy David Robert Monckton (b. 1955).
The heir presumptive's heir apparent is his son Dominic Walter Monckton (b. 1985).

Coat of arms of Viscount Monckton of Brenchley
Crest A martlet Or. Escutcheon 1st & 4th Sable on a chevron between three martlets Or three mullets Sable (Monckton) 2nd & 3rd Or a chevron Gules a chief Vair (St Quintin). Supporters On either side a horse Argent crined and unguled Or gorged with a chain Gold pendant therefrom an escutcheon Sable charged with a roses also Argent barbed and seeded Proper quartering St Quintin (Gules a chevron Or a chief Vair). Motto Famam Extendere Factis Badge Within an annulet a martlet Or.
