= Henry Brenchley =

English cricketer

Henry Brenchley (30 September 1828 – 24 February 1887) was an English army officer and amateur cricketer. He played in three first-class cricket matches for Kent County Cricket Club between 1854 and 1857. He was born at Milton-next-Gravesend in Kent and died at Dover in 1887 aged 58.

He was the youngest son of John Brenchley of Wombwell Hall, Northfleet parish, Kent, and his wife Mary Rachel Harman; Thomas Harman Brenchley was his elder brother. He joined the Royal Navy, but then took over the commission in the 31st Foot of another elder brother who had been killed. He retired with the rank of captain.

Brenchley played as a tail-end batsman in each of his three first-class games and made only 17 runs in five innings without bowling. He also played in minor games for the Gentlemen of Kent amateur team and Gravesend Cricket Club and made one appearance for the Marylebone Cricket Club in 1879. His brother Thomas also played first-class cricket for Kent and in Gentlemen of Kent matches.

== Bibliography ==
- Carlaw, Derek (2020). Kent County Cricketers, A to Z: Part One (1806–1914) (PDF). Cardiff: ACS.
