= Gilbert Monckton, 2nd Viscount Monckton of Brenchley =

British Army officer and peer (1915–2006)

Major-General The Right Honourable The Viscount Monckton of Brenchley CB OBE MC DL FSA
- Monckton by Elliott & Fry, 1962
- Born: 3 November 1915; Ightham, Kent
- Died: 22 June 2006 (aged 90); Harrietsham, Kent,
- Burial place: All Saints' Church, Brenchley, Kent, England
- Education: Harrow School, Trinity College, Cambridge
- Spouse: Marianna Laetitia Bower (m. 1950)
- Children: 5, including Christopher and Rosamond
- Father: Walter Monckton, 1st Viscount Monckton of Brenchley
- Relatives: Valerie Goulding (sister)

Major-General Gilbert Walter Riversdale Monckton, 2nd Viscount Monckton of Brenchley (3 November 1915 – 22 June 2006) served in the British Army from 1939 to 1967. He was Army director of public relations in the 1960s when the conduct of the Army's personnel came under scrutiny during the Profumo affair.

== Early life ==
Monckton was the only son of Walter Monckton, 1st Viscount Monckton of Brenchley, created Viscount in 1957, and Mary Adelaide Somes Colyer-Ferguson. He was born at Ightham Mote, which was owned by his maternal grandfather, Sir Thomas Colyer-Fergusson. Monckton's sister, Valerie Goulding, founded the Irish Central Remedial Clinic and became a member of the Seanad Éireann. His father was a British lawyer and politician, and became chief legal advisor to King Edward VIII during the Abdication Crisis in 1936.

== Education and Second World War ==
Monckton was educated at The New Beacon, Harrow and then read agriculture at Trinity College, Cambridge, graduating in 1939. He converted to Roman Catholicism at the University of Cambridge.

After Cambridge, Monckton immediately joined the Army, being commissioned into the 5th Royal Inniskilling Dragoon Guards, which was part of the British Expeditionary Force in France. He commanded a troop on the River Dyle in Belgium, facing the advance of the German blitzkrieg, and he received the Military Cross for his actions on 18 May 1940 in the retreat to the River Dendre. He was evacuated from Dunkirk with his regiment in 1940, and attended the Staff College, Camberley in 1941, serving as a brigade major from 1942 to 1943. He then attended the Command and General Staff School in the United States, before joining the 3rd (King's Own) Hussars in Palestine in 1944, moving with it to Italy in 1944. He then rejoined his own regiment in Germany. He attended RAF Staff College in 1949, and was then GSO2 in the 7th Armoured Division.

Monckton was appointed as a Knight of the Sovereign Military Order of Malta and was promoted to Bailiff Grand Cross of Obedience of the Order. He was an active supporter and long-serving member of the Sacred Military Constantinian Order of Saint George, in which he held the rank of Bailiff Knight Grand Cross of Justice, and was a Knight Grand Cross of its sister order the Royal Order of Francis I.

== Korean War ==
He returned to his regiment to command "A" squadron in the Korean War from 1951 to 1952, and became second in command. He was promoted lieutenant-colonel and served in the War Office, and was appointed OBE in 1956. He then commanded the 12th Royal Lancers in Germany for two years, and next was promoted brigadier in 1961 and took a staff posting to the War Office as deputy director of personnel administration.

He was promoted major general in 1963, and became Army director of public relations, dealing with press scrutiny into the behaviour of soldiers in Germany in the aftermath of unhelpful comments from the Secretary of State for War, John Profumo. He became chief of staff at the Headquarters of the British Army of the Rhine in 1965. He was appointed a Commander of the Belgian Order of the Crown in 1965 (Leopold III of Belgium was Colonel of his regiment), and Companion of the Order of the Bath in 1966. He left the army in 1967 but was colonel of the 9th/12th Royal Lancers from 1967 to 1973.

== Retirement years ==
In retirement, he ran his 350-acre (1.4 km^{2}) farm near Maidstone, Kent. He served on the board of directors of Anglo-Portuguese Bank, Burberrys and Ransomes. He regularly attended the House of Lords, having succeeded to the Viscountcy in 1965, speaking on rural affairs and the armed forces. Originally a Conservative, he resigned the whip to become a cross-bencher. He was a Deputy Lieutenant of Kent from 1970, and his wife was High Sheriff of Kent in 1981 and 1982. He was interested in archaeology, and pursued an active interest in heraldry, being President of the Institute of Heraldic and Genealogical Studies for 35 years (1965–2000). He became a Grand Officer of the Belgian Order of Leopold II in 1978. He lost his right to sit and vote in the House of Lords in 1999; in his attempt to become one of the ninety-two elected hereditary peers, he submitted a manifesto which included "I support the Queen and all the royal family... All cats to be muzzled outside to stop the agonising torture of mice and small birds... LEVEL UP not level down. God willing."

== Family and issue ==
Monckton married Marianna Laetitia Bower (1929–2022), a Roman Catholic and the daughter of Commander Robert Tatton Bower (RN), on 30 December 1950. She later became a Dame of Malta, President of Kent St John's Ambulance, Patroness of the Heart of Kent Hospice, and High Sheriff of Kent (1981–82). She died peacefully in July 2022, aged 93, at her home in Harrietsham, Kent.

The couple had five children:

- Christopher Monckton, 3rd Viscount Monckton of Brenchley (born 14 February 1952): a journalist, politician, and creator of the Eternity puzzle;
- Rosamond Mary Monckton, Baroness Monckton of Dallington Forest (born 1953): married Dominic Lawson, who has written that "my father-in-law was vetoed as the Governor-General of New Zealand explicitly because he was a Catholic convert". She was elevated to the peerage in 2024.
- The Honourable Timothy David Robert Monckton (born 1955)
- The Honourable Jonathan Riversdale St. Quintin Monckton (born 1955)
- The Honourable Anthony Leopold Colyer Monckton (born 1960)

== Arms ==
Coat of arms of Gilbert Monckton, 2nd Viscount Monckton of Brenchley
Crest A martlet Or. Escutcheon 1st & 4th Sable on a chevron between three martlets Or three mullets Sable (Monckton) 2nd & 3rd Or a chevron Gules a chief Vair (St Quintin). Supporters On either side a horse Argent crined and unguled Or gorged with a chain Gold pendant therefrom an escutcheon Sable charged with a roses also Argent barbed and seeded Proper quartering St Quintin (Gules a chevron Or a chief Vair). Motto Famam Extendere Factis Badge Within an annulet a martlet Or.

Peerage of the United Kingdom
Preceded by Walter Monckton	Viscount Monckton of Brenchley; 1965–2006	Succeeded by Christopher Monckton
