= Dominic Lawson =

English journalist (born 1956)

The Honourable Dominic Lawson
- Born: 17 December 1956 (age 69); Wandsworth, London, England
- Education: Christ Church, Oxford
- Occupation: Newspaper columnist
- Spouses: Jane Whytehead (m. 1982–1991) Rosa Monckton (m. 1991)
- Children: 3 (1 deceased)
- Father: Nigel Lawson
- Relatives: Nigella Lawson (sister)

Dominic Ralph Campden Lawson (born 17 December 1956) is a British journalist.

== Background ==
Lawson was born to a Jewish family, the elder son of Conservative politician Nigel Lawson, Baron Lawson of Blaby and his first wife, socialite Vanessa Salmon. He was educated at Eton College, an all-boys independent boarding school, for one year, which he "absolutely hated". He then completed his schooling at Westminster School, also an independent school. He studied history at Christ Church, Oxford. Lawson had three sisters: the TV chef and writer Nigella Lawson; Horatia; and Thomasina (who died of breast cancer in 1993 in her early 30s). Their mother, an heir to the Lyons Corner House empire, died from liver cancer in 1985. Lawson's father was Chancellor of the Exchequer between 1983 and 1989.

He has been married to Rosa Monckton, a Roman Catholic, the daughter of the 2nd Viscount Monckton of Brenchley, since 1991. The Lawsons have two daughters (another daughter, Natalia, was stillborn), Domenica Marianna Tertia and Savannah Vanessa Lucia; Domenica, who is a goddaughter of Diana, Princess of Wales was born with Down syndrome.

== Career ==
Lawson joined the BBC as a researcher, and then wrote for the Financial Times. From 1990 until 1995 he was editor of The Spectator magazine, a post his father had occupied from 1966 to 1970. In his capacity as editor of The Spectator he conducted, in June 1990, an interview with the cabinet minister Nicholas Ridley in which Ridley expressed opinions immensely hostile to Germany and the European Community, likening the initiatives of Jacques Delors and others to those of Hitler.

From 1995 until 2005, Lawson was editor of The Sunday Telegraph. In 2006, he started to write columns for The Independent newspaper and in 2008, he became the main columnist for The Sunday Times. In his article for The Independent dated 2 September 2013, he wrote that it would be his last for that newspaper, although he did not give a reason.

He was a strong chess player and was the author of The Inner Game, on the inside story of the 1993 World Chess Championship. He was also involved in the organisation of the 1983 World Chess championship semi-final. Lawson wrote a monthly chess column in Standpoint. In 2014 he was elected president of the English Chess Federation.

Richard Tomlinson wrote in 2001 that Lawson had worked with the intelligence agency MI6, but Lawson denied being an agent. Boris Johnson, then editor of The Spectator, wrote a pseudonymous article on the subject which Lawson (then editor of The Sunday Telegraph) found "intensely annoying" because of the potential increase in the threat to his newspaper's foreign correspondents. However, in 1998, Lawson acknowledged that articles written in 1994, under a false name with a Sarajevo dateline while he was editor of the Spectator magazine, were "probably" written by an MI6 officer.

In 2009, Lawson published an editorial asserting that women's athletic events receive less media coverage because they aren't as impressive as the men's, making the game less interesting to watch. Unlike women, "with truly exceptional men, there is something extra, a kind of gasping astonishment on our part that such strength and power could be encompassed by a human being at all." He claimed most of the women's cricket crowd was the athletes' friends and family, and compared women's teams negatively to the Special Olympics, criticizing the concept of inclusivity. He concludes the article by saying that the BBC shouldn't have to broadcast people like his daughter, who has special needs, participating in sports.

In 2016, Lawson attributed the result of the United Kingdom European Union membership referendum to the legalisation of same-sex marriage, although he personally supported same sex marriage. "I had lunch with UKIP's leader at that time. I recall how gleeful he was at the way the gay marriage row was sending shire Tories in droves to switch to UKIP membership. Though Farage himself is a libertarian, and definitely no moralist, he exploited this to the full."

In his column in The Sunday Times on 30th August 2026 he announced it would be his last column for the paper.

== Views on climate change and energy policy ==
Dominic Lawson's father Nigel was a climate change sceptic and served as chairman of the Global Warming Policy Foundation. Dominic Lawson has written numerous articles in various UK media outlets disputing the scientific consensus on the harms of climate change and criticising environmental protests.

In March 2006, Lawson wrote an article for The Independent in which he stated that, because the UK accounted for only 2% of global CO2 emissions, a reduction of those emissions to zero would create 'no statistically significant effect on the future of the world's climate'. Questioning 'the assumption that global warming is indeed the looming Armageddon', Lawson stated that 'there is a significant minority of genuine experts in the field who believe that the Armageddon scenario is grossly oversold, especially by climatologists in pursuit of government funding and research grants'. He added that the 'anti-global warming campaign' resembles an 'established religion', which 'like many primitive religions [...] is based around sun-worship, and the fear of natural catastrophe, such as a flood that will drown us all'. In response to the article, Dr Douglas Parr, Chief Scientific Advisor at Greenpeace UK, wrote that Lawson 'uses classic, erroneous apologist arguments for doing nothing about climate change'.

In March 2008, in an article for The Independent, Lawson drew attention to the use of private jets by Arnold Schwarzenegger and of ministerial cars by government ministers such as Ed Balls and Shaun Woodward, asking 'if ministers truly believe what they say about the dire threat of irreversible and murderous climate change through man-made carbon emissions, how could they simultaneously behave in such a casually wasteful manner?' He suggested that 'the ministers, deep down, don't really believe the conventional wisdom' on climate change, and that this was reflected in their policy proposals.

In October 2009, in an article for The Independent, Lawson cited the work of Ken Caldeira to argue that 'increases in carbon dioxide can be a positive benefit' to biodiversity, and the work of Nathan Myhrvold to argue that increases in CO2 follow increases in global temperature, rather than vice versa. He wrote that 'this might help to explain why the recorded temperature of the planet has not increased at all over the past 11 years' (a reference to a global warming hiatus). He argued that if 'our political leaders are not mistaken in taking the view that the threat to mankind does come from the greenhouse effect and its consequences', a possible solution lay in geoengineering, through the release of sulphur dioxide to simulate the effects of volcanoes.

In an article in The Sunday Times in September 2013, Lawson said that the Intergovernmental Panel on Climate Change had played down the recent global warming hiatus, a 'standstill in the global average temperature' from 1998 to 2013, 'a total of 15 years in which no increased warming trend in global land average temperatures has been detected'.

In November 2016, in an article in The Sunday Times, Lawson called the UN Framework Convention on Climate Change 'a plan by western governments to penalise their own industrial base, to the benefit of the economies of China and the rest of the developing world', and described the 2008 Climate Change Act as an 'act of virtue-signalling' and a 'unilateral and monstrous act of self-harm'.

Lawson criticised Extinction Rebellion (XR), stating that the aims of the group were 'to reduce us to a state of mere subsistence, last seen in the pre-industrial age when life was (for the great majority) nasty, brutish and short'. He said that the protests lacked a scientific foundation, writing that 'the Extinction Rebellion panic seems more reliant on skunk than science for its inspiration'. In August 2021 he wrote that the 'XR faithful', in promoting degrowth, had failed to recognise the role of western consumerism and developing world industrialisation, in alleviating global poverty.

In April 2024, Lawson wrote an article for The Sunday Times criticising a recent speech by Simon Stiell, Executive Secretary of the UN Framework Convention on Climate Change, in which he reportedly said that 'We have two years to save the world'. Lawson stated that 'experts' never make 'claims of imminent planetary doom', 'since none of the scientific reports of the Intergovernmental Panel on Climate Change have warned of human or planetary extinction as a result of anthropogenic CO2 emissions'.

In August 2025, Lawson wrote an article for The Sunday Times entitled 'We'd rather gush pieties than benefit from oil and gas', in which he argued that the Prime Minister of the UK, Sir Keir Starmer, and the Secretary of State for Energy and Net Zero, Ed Miliband, would look like 'naive exceptions' at the forthcoming COP30 climate conference in Belem, since their government had banned new oil and gas exploration, 'something no other producing nation is doing'.

== Publications ==
- Lawson, Dominic, The Inner Game, Hardinge Simpole Limited, 2008, ISBN 1-84382-137-0
- Diamond, John, Dawkins, Richard (Foreword), Dominic Lawson (Editor), Snake Oil and Other Preoccupations, Vintage, 2001, ISBN 0-09-942833-4
- Lawson, Dominic, End Game: Kasparov vs. Short, Harmony, 1994, ISBN 0-517-59810-8

Media offices
Preceded by Charles Moore	Editor of The Spectator; 1990–1995	Succeeded by Frank Johnson
Preceded by Charles Moore	Editor of The Sunday Telegraph; 1995–2005	Succeeded by Sarah Sands
