= Andrew Gimson =

British political journalist (born 1958)

Andrew Gimson /ˈdʒɪmsən/ (born 1958) is a British political journalist and son of the former soldier and Blundell's headmaster Clive Gimson MC. Gimson formerly wrote the parliamentary sketch for The Daily Telegraph and has written a novel entitled The Desired Effect, as well as books about Boris Johnson, British monarchs and British Prime Ministers.

In November 2011 he was succeeded as sketch writer on The Daily Telegraph by Michael Deacon. Gimson was educated at Uppingham School, where he attended West Bank House, and Trinity College, Cambridge. He briefly worked in the Conservative Research Department in 1983 before starting his journalism career at The Spectator, commentating on public affairs.

He is married to Sally Gimson (née Malcolm-Smith), who stood in the South Leicestershire constituency as an unsuccessful candidate for the Labour Party in the May 2010 general election.

== Books ==
- The Desired Effect (1991)
- Boris: The Rise of Boris Johnson (2006)
- Gimson's Kings and Queens: Brief Lives of the Forty Monarchs since 1066 (2015)
- Gimson's Prime Ministers: Brief Lives from Walpole to May (2018), illustrated by Martin Rowson
- Gimson's Presidents: Brief Lives from Washington to Trump (2020), illustrated by Martin Rowson
- Boris Johnson: The Rise and Fall of a Troublemaker at Number 10 (2023)
