= Kim Fletcher =

British journalist and newspaper editor (born 1956)

- Born: 17 September 1956 (age 70)
- Education: Heversham Grammar School; Hertford College, Oxford; University College, Cardiff
- Occupations: Journalist and editor
- Known for: Editor, The Independent on Sunday, 1998–99
- Spouse: Sarah Sands
- Children: 2

Kim Fletcher (born 17 September 1956) is a British former journalist and newspaper editor, and is currently a partner of the international corporate communications firm Brunswick.

Fletcher attended Heversham Grammar School, Westmorland, and read law at Hertford College, Oxford. He later received a postgraduate diploma in journalism from University College, Cardiff. He worked for various newspapers before being appointed news editor and then deputy editor of The Sunday Telegraph. He left to become editor of The Independent on Sunday from 1998 to 1999, then returned to be editorial director of Hollinger's Telegraph New Media, the internet arm of Telegraph Group Limited, from 2000 to 2003 and editorial director of Telegraph Group Limited from 2003 to 2005.

He served as chairman of the National Council for the Training of Journalists (NCTJ) between 2004 and 2024. Upon stepping down as chairman in 2024, he was named emeritus chairman.

Fletcher is author of The Journalist's Handbook (Macmillan).

== Personal life ==
Fletcher is married to the journalist Sarah Sands, former editor of the Today programme, and former editor of the Evening Standard and The Sunday Telegraph. They have a son and a daughter.

Media offices
Preceded by Frank Johnson	Deputy Editor of the Sunday Telegraph; 1995–1998	Succeeded by Matthew D'Ancona
Preceded by Rosie Boycott	Editor of The Independent on Sunday; 1998–1999	Succeeded by Janet Street-Porter
