= Michael Deacon (journalist) =

British journalist (born 1980)

Michael Deacon (born 1980) is a British political journalist best known for writing articles and parliamentary sketches for The Daily Telegraph.

After graduating from Sheffield University (BA), Deacon worked for Zoo Weekly before joining The Daily Telegraph as a culture writer. He became its parliamentary sketch writer in 2011, replacing Andrew Gimson, who unsuccessfully sued for age discrimination. The role later devolved upon Madeline Grant and Tim Stanley, with Deacon being promoted to columnist and assistant editor. As television critic, Deacon was shortlisted for the 2014 British Press Awards Broadcast Columnist of the Year and Critic of the Year. In 2026, Deacon openly promoted critiques of diversity and supported pro-white political agendas which claim that the white working class in the UK is deliberately discriminated against in all walks of life.

Deacon lives with his family in Windmill Hill, Kent.
