= Chattering classes =

Description for politically active middle class

Painting by Albert Joseph Franke (c. 1900), depicting three gentlemen conversing in an 18th century rococo-style drawing room.

The chattering classes is a politically-active, socially-concerned and university-educated section of the "metropolitan middle class", especially those with political, media, and academic connections. It is a generally derogatory term, often used by pundits and political commentators.

== United Kingdom ==
It is sometimes used to refer to a supposedly elite category of people, but its use by British journalist Frank Johnson in 1980 appeared to include a wider range of pundits, however its first usage can be dated to the 1800s. Since then the term is used by people all across the political spectrum to refer to the journalists and political operatives who see themselves as the arbiters of conventional wisdom. As such, the notion of "chattering classes" can be seen as an antonym to the older idea of an un- or under-represented silent majority, a term which was made notable in the USA by President Richard Nixon.

== United States ==
In the United States, the term has come to be used by both the left and right and to describe political opponents, with Stephen Perrault of the Merriam-Webster dictionary suggesting that the term has "connotations of idleness, of useless talk, that the noun 'chatter' does. ... These people don't amount to much—they like to hear themselves talk."

== See also ==
- Intelligentsia
- Tertulia, a Spanish term for a gathering of those who may be among the chattering classes
- Thought leader
