= Peter Hadfield (journalist) =

British journalist and YouTuber

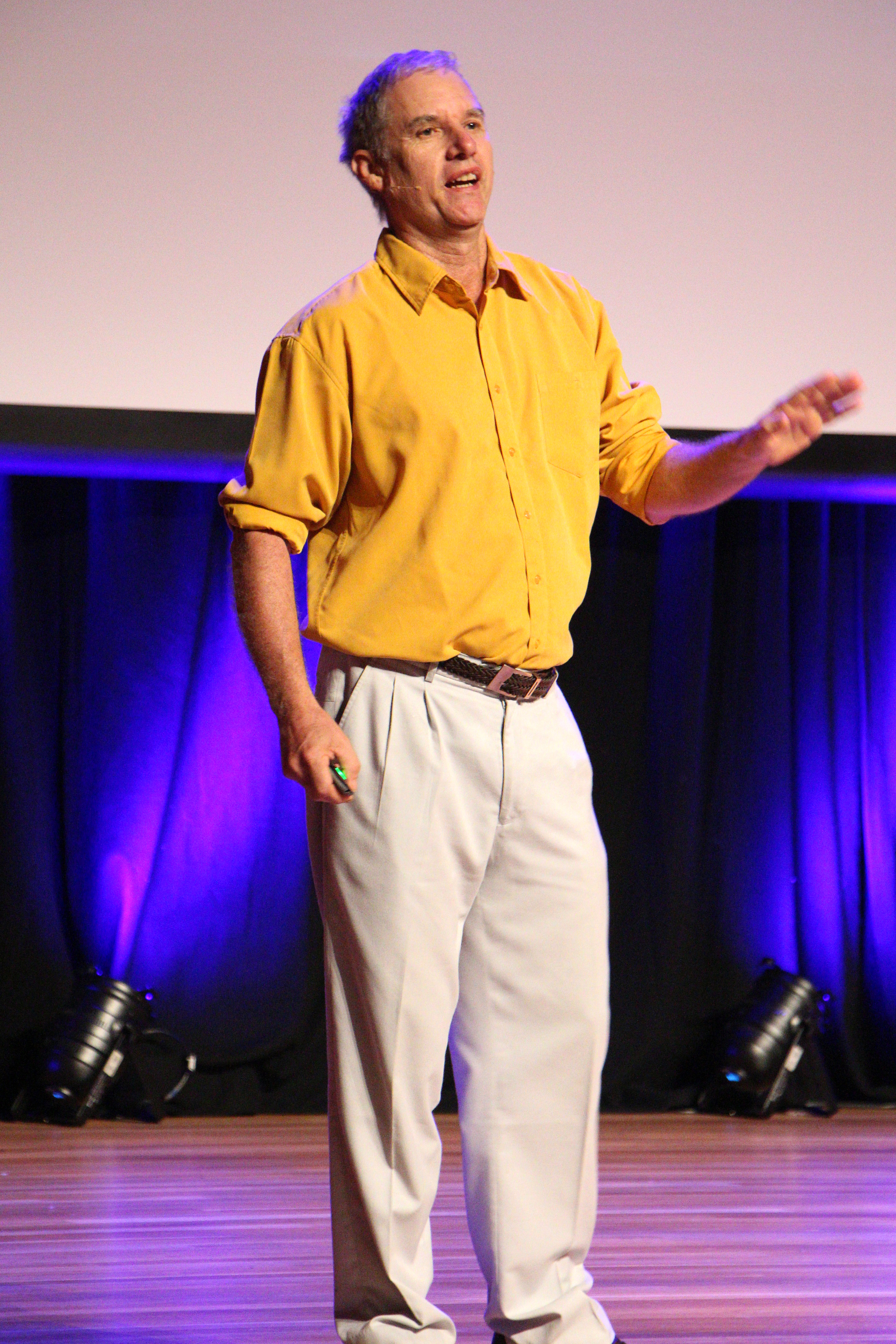
- Hadfield in 2014
- Born: 1 July 1954 (age 71)
- Occupations: Journalist; author; geologist; YouTuber

YouTube information
- Channel: potholer54
- Years active: 2007–present
- Subscribers: 239 thousand
- Views: 36 million
- Last updated: May 14, 2025

Peter Hadfield (born 1 July 1954) is a British freelance journalist, author, and geologist, who runs the YouTube channel Potholer54, which has over 200,000 subscribers. He has previously lived in Japan, and now lives in Australia.

== Early life and education ==
Peter Hadfield's father was child psychiatrist Dr. Ian Hadfield.

Hadfield has a degree in geology from Kingston University.

== Reporting career ==
Hadfield wrote a weekly humour column for The Mainichi Daily News (the English edition of the Japanese-language Mainichi Shimbun) while living in Japan. He was The Sunday Times correspondent in Tokyo from 1988 to 1990, then wrote a regular column for the Daily Mail on life in Japan.

Later he became Tokyo correspondent for the Sunday Telegraph and U.S. News & World Report. He was also the Tokyo correspondent for New Scientist for 14 years. His writing has appeared in other publications, such as the BBC News website, USA Today, The Guardian, The Independent, The Daily Telegraph, The South China Morning Post and The Lancet.

In 1991 Hadfield became Far East correspondent for Monitor Radio, and reported throughout East Asia. During this period, Hadfield wrote and appeared on screen regularly as a correspondent for CNN, the Australian Broadcasting Corporation (ABC), ABC News (U.S.) and the Canadian Broadcasting Corporation (CBC).

Hadfield's book, "Sixty Seconds that Will Change the World," about the potential implications of an earthquake in Tokyo, was published by Sidgwick & Jackson in 1991. A second revised edition was published by Pan and Tuttle in 1995 after the Kobe earthquake.

In 1995, Hadfield was one of a group of reporters at the Foreign Correspondents' Club of Japan (FCCJ) that interviewed Tatsusaburo Suzuki, a lieutenant colonel in the Imperial Japanese Army (IJA) who had served during World War II as the IJA's liaison to the Japanese nuclear weapons programme, about the activities and progression of Imperial Japan's nuclear programme over the course of the war. Hadfield published an article about Suzuki's revelations in New Scientist that same year. On 13 January 2024, fearing the potential that the FCCJ could one day become defunct, Hadfield uploaded the full interview to his YouTube channel, where he also expressed dismay about what he saw as the time wasted by amateur tabloid reporters who did not understand science and asked Suzuki to explain basic facts about nuclear physics to them, referencing an instance of a tabloid reporter asking Suzuki to explain to him what a neutron was.

More recently, he has contributed regularly to the CBC, NPR, and BBC radio programmes Costing The Earth, Science in Action, The World Tonight, Outlook and East Asia Today, as well as the ABC's Science Show.

== YouTube career ==
Hadfield, known on YouTube as "Potholer54" and "Potholer54debunks", has made videos about various scientific topics, such as the science behind global warming, including debunking Climategate "with gentle sarcasm", the age of the Earth (debunking arguments used by young Earth creationists to claim the Earth or universe are young), and how 'tricks of the trade' in journalism can be used to fool viewers. In March 2010 Hadfield penned an opinion piece on his YouTube series for The Guardian. Hadfield has debunked claims made by Christopher Monckton about climate science in a series entitled "Monckton Bunkum." His video about how climate change deniers have claimed that the earth has been cooling since 1998 was called "true skepticism at its best" by Maggie Koerth-Baker.

An analysis of Reddit posts during 2016-19 found that Hadfield's videos were often linked to from climate subreddits.
