= Rosa Monckton, Baroness Monckton of Dallington Forest =

English businesswoman and charity campaigner (born 1953)

The Right Honourable The Baroness Monckton of Dallington Forest MBE
- Official portrait, 2026

Member of the House of Lords
- Lord Temporal
- Life peerage 12 March 2024

Personal details
- Born: Rosamond Mary Monckton; 26 October 1953 (age 73)
- Party: Conservative
- Spouse: Dominic Lawson
- Children: 3
- Parent: The 2nd Viscount Monckton of Brenchley (father)
- Relatives: Christopher Monckton, 3rd Viscount Monckton of Brenchley (brother)
- Occupation: Businesswoman and charity campaigner

Rosamond Mary Monckton, Baroness Monckton of Dallington Forest, MBE (born 26 October 1953) is an English businesswoman and charity campaigner.

== Background ==
Rosa Monckton was born on 26 October 1953 to Gilbert Monckton, 2nd Viscount Monckton of Brenchley, and Marianna, Viscountess Monckton of Brenchley (née Bower). The only daughter of five siblings, her elder brother is Christopher, a journalist, public speaker, and outspoken climate change denier. Monckton was educated at the Ursuline Convent in Tildonk, Belgium.

She is married to the journalist Dominic Lawson (son of Conservative politician Nigel Lawson and brother of the food writer Nigella Lawson). They have two daughters, Domenica and Savannah. Domenica has Down syndrome; her godmother was Monckton's friend Diana, Princess of Wales. Monckton had a stillbirth in 1994, the baby was buried in a garden on the grounds of Kensington Palace with Diana's help.

Monckton was appointed Member of the Order of the British Empire (MBE) in the 2017 Birthday Honours for voluntary and charitable services to people with learning disabilities and their families in the UK and abroad. She was nominated for a life peerage by Prime Minister Rishi Sunak and was created Baroness Monckton of Dallington Forest, of Earlsdown in the County of East Sussex, on 12 March 2024.

== Political views ==
In 2017, Monckton wrote for The Spectator arguing for learning-disabled people to be able to work for pay lower than the minimum wage, citing 1.3 million unemployed people of 1.4 million people with learning disabilities in the UK. This article was criticised by some in the disability rights movement.

In 2025 she tabled an amendment to the Crime and Policing Bill during its passage through the House of Lords, aiming to remove clause 208, which if passed will change the criminal law so it would no longer be illegal for a woman to perform her own abortion.

== Fundraising ==
Rosa Monckton is a fundraiser and supports several charities relating to children and Down syndrome.

The charities include:

- The Acorns Children's Hospice for the care of life limited children in the heart of England
- Downside Up, a Down syndrome charity in Russia
- The Down's Syndrome Educational Trust, based in Portsmouth, England, which through research provides education, information and training to promote the development of children with Down syndrome
- Kids (charity), a disabled children's charity based in England. KIDS helps in developing and improving the lives of disabled children
- The Bulgarian Abandoned Children's Trust, a British charity dedicated to helping disabled and disadvantaged children in Bulgaria and campaigning for an end to the use of institutional care
- Team Domenica, a charity named after her daughter which supports young adults with learning disabilities to find employment

== Coat of arms ==
Coat of arms of Rosa Monckton, Baroness Monckton of Dallington Forest
| Escutcheon 1st & 4th Sable on a chevron between three martlets Or three mullets Sable (Monckton) 2nd & 3rd Or a chevron Gules a chief Vair (St Quintin). Motto Famam Extendere Factis Badge Within an annulet a martlet Or. |
