= Stick puzzle =

Type of combination puzzle

Stick puzzles are a type of combination puzzle that uses multiple sticks or 'polysticks' (which can be one-dimensional objects) to assemble two- or three-dimensional configurations.

Polysticks are configurations of joined or unjoined thin (ideally one-dimensional) 'sticks'. The sticks may be; line segments on paper, matchsticks, pieces of straw, wire or similar.

A special class of stick puzzles are 'matchstick puzzles', where all parts used are sticks (usually matchsticks) rather than polysticks. Some trick puzzles can only be solved when one assumes that the sticks actually have measurements in more than one dimension. Three-dimensional arrangements like tetrastix can also be made from matchsticks.

== Examples of stick puzzles ==
- Matchstick puzzles
- Burr puzzle
- Hexastix
- Stick bomb
