= Shin-Tson Wu =

- 吳詩聰
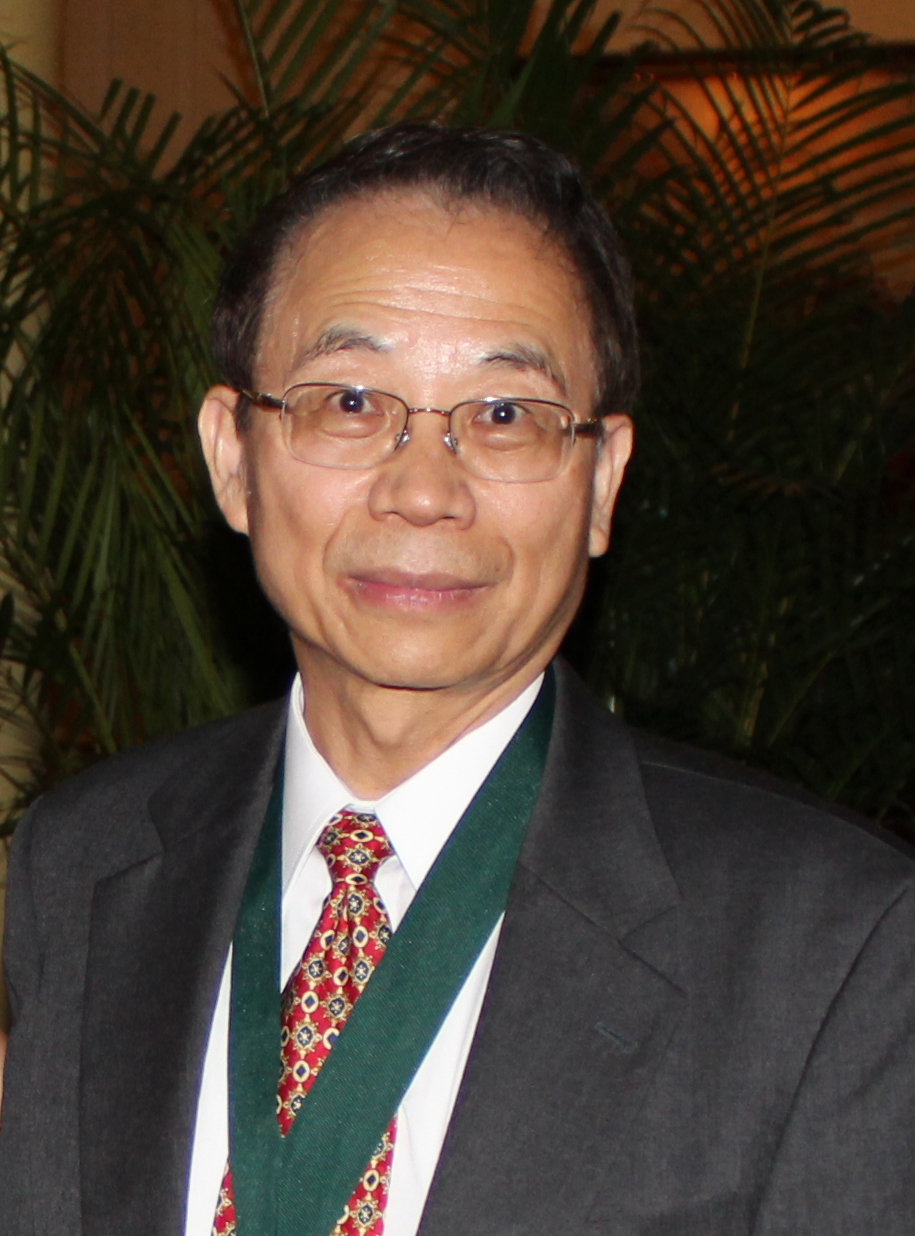
- Born: Nantou, Taiwan
- Education: National Taiwan University (BS); University of Southern California (PhD)
- Known for: His works on liquid crystal displays and tunable photonic devices
- Scientific career
- Fields: Physics, Optics
- Workplaces: University of Central Florida
- Doctoral advisor: Michael B. Bass

Shin-Tson Wu, (Chinese: 吳詩聰) is a Taiwanese-American physicist. He is a Pegasus Professor at the University of Central Florida College of Optics and Photonics. He is known for his contributions to liquid-crystal research and the resulting patent portfolio for next-generation liquid crystal displays (LCDs), adaptive optics, laser-beam steering, and new photonic materials.

== Early life and education ==
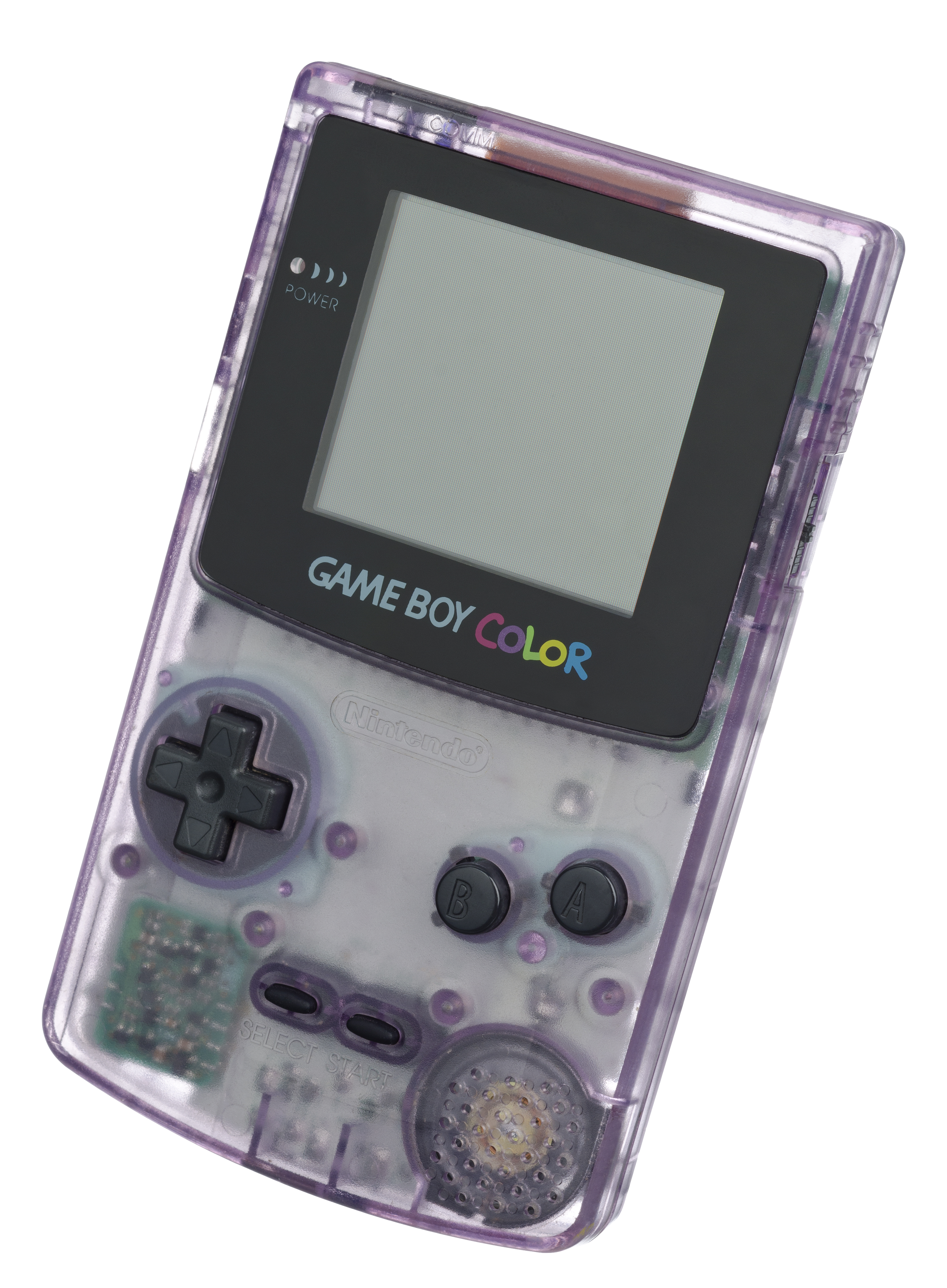
Wu's invention of mixed-mode twisted nematic liquid crystal display have been widely implemented in commercial products.

Wu was born in Nantou, Taiwan. After high school, he graduated from National Taiwan University with a B.S. in physics in 1975. He then earned a Ph.D. in physics from the University of Southern California in 1981.

== Career ==
Shin-Tson Wu is a Trustee chair professor at College of Optics and Photonics, University of Central Florida (UCF). His research interests at UCF focus on augmented reality and virtual reality displays, including light engines (LCOS, mini-LED, micro-LED, and OLED), optical systems (lightguide, diffractive optics, and projection optics), and display materials (liquid crystals, quantum dots, and perovskites).

He was the founding Editor-In-Chief of the IEEE/OSA Journal of Display Technology, SID Honors and Awards Committee chair, and Optica (formerly OSA) publications council chair and board of directors.

== Awards and honors ==
Memberships

- 2022, Academician of Academia Sinica
- 2014, Among the first six inductees to the Florida Inventors Hall of Fame
- 2012, Charter Fellow of National Academy of Inventors
- 2007, Fellow of The International Society for Optics and Photonics (SPIE)
- 2004, Fellow of the IEEE
- 2001, Fellow of the Society for Information Displays (SID)
- 1993, Fellow of the Optical Society of America (Optica)

Awards

- 2024, UCF Medal of Societal Impact
- 2022, Academician of Academia Sinica
- 2022, SPIE Maria Goeppert-Mayer Award
- 2022, Optica Edwin H. Land Medal
- 2014, Optica Esther Hoffman Beller Medal
- 2011, SID Slottow-Owaki Prize
- 2010, Optica Joseph Fraunhofer Award/Robert M. Burley Prize
- 2008, SID Jan Rajchman Prize
- 2008, SPIE G. G. Stokes Award
- 2000, SID Special Recognition Award
- 1991, Hughes Research Laboratories Team Achievement Award

Honorary Titles

- 2014, Inaugural Inductee of Florida Inventors Hall of Fame

== Books ==
- J. H. Lee, I.C. Cheng, H. Hua, and S. T. Wu, Introduction to Flat Panel Displays 2nd Edition. (Wiley, 2020)
- D. K. Yang and S. T. Wu, Fundamentals of Liquid Crystal Devices, 2nd Edition (Wiley, 2014)
- H. Ren and S. T. Wu, Introduction to Adaptive Lenses (Wiley, 2012)
- Z. Ge and S. T. Wu, Transflective Liquid Crystal Displays (Wiley, 2010)
- D. Armitage, I. Underwood and S. T. Wu, Introduction to Microdisplays (Wiley, 2006)
- S. T. Wu and D. K. Yang, Reflective Liquid Crystal Displays (Wiley, 2001)
- I. C. Khoo and S. T. Wu, Optics and Nonlinear Optics of Liquid Crystals (World Scientific, 1993)

== See also ==
- Liquid-crystal display
- Transflective liquid-crystal display
- Blue phase mode LCD
- University of Central Florida
- University of Central Florida College of Optics and Photonics
