= Sticky bomb (disambiguation) =

Sticky bomb can refer to

- Sticky bomb the popular name for the "No. 74 Grenade ST"
- SS-HL-Handgranate, a German anti-tank grenade that used an adhesive pad to stick to the target
- Hafthohlladung, a German anti-tank grenade that used magnets to stick to a tank.
- Improvised explosive devices that rely on some sort of adhesive to remain on the target
- Plot point in Saving Private Ryan
- Nickname of a drummer in the Swedish hard rock band Wilmer X

== See also ==
- Stick grenade
- Stick bomb
- Limpet mine
