= Pentangle (puzzle supplier) =

Mechanical puzzle distribution company

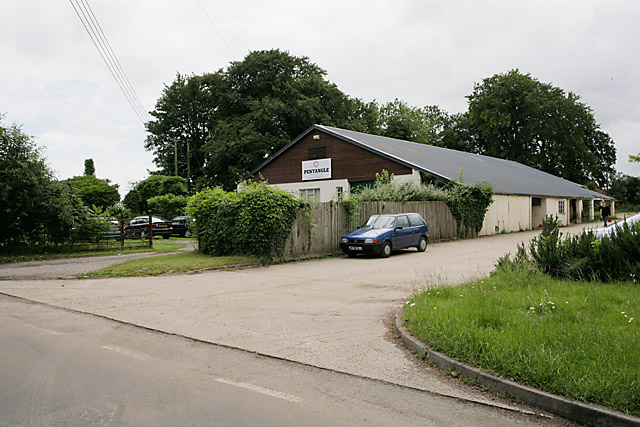
The premises of Pentangle Puzzles in Over Wallop, in 2007

Pentangle, later Pentangle Puzzles, was a British manufacturer and distributor of burr puzzles and other mechanical puzzles. It operated in the UK from 1971 until 2018. It was best known as the first company to distribute what became called "Rubik's Cube" outside Hungary.

== Early history ==
Pentangle was set up as a family business by Ron Cook. It operated from premises in Over Wallop in rural Hampshire, England, originally with seven employees including Cook's wife, daughter and son.

It was registered as a company in 1971, by Cook and his business partner James Dalgety, with the name Paradox Engineering Ltd. to avoid infringing the rights of the band Pentangle. It traded as Pentangle.

Pentangle's first product was a burr puzzle, the Woodchuck puzzle, whose object was to assemble 24 wooden pieces into an octahedral shape. It sold hundreds of thousands of these. Pentangle eventually made a total of 314 different burr puzzles, and from 1979 made and sold the "Chinese Cross", a compendium of 42 pieces including all the pieces required to assemble any of these puzzles.

Pentangle also made disentanglement puzzles, most famously the Double Treble Clef puzzle, and sliding block and other puzzles.

In 1976, a wooden puzzle designed by Pentangle for the World Wildlife Fund to offer in its catalogue was expected to sell no more than 3000 copies. But within three weeks of publication 16,000 orders had been received.

== The Magic Cube ==
A Rubik's Cube (probably of more recent manufacture than those distributed by Pentangle)

In December 1977 a Hungarian puzzle collector, Tibor Szentiványi, told Dalgety about a new puzzle: Bűvös Kocka, initially known in English as the Magic Cube. In June 1979 Professor David Singmaster, who had first seen the cube at a mathematics conference in Helsinki in 1978, wrote an article in The Observer praising and recommending the cube. Pentangle was now able to sell 20,000 Magic Cubes a year at about £5 each.

However, later in 1979 another branch of the Hungarian government revoked the deal with Pentangle, and did a deal with Ideal Toys in the US. Ideal Toys agreed that Pentangle could sell what it now renamed as "Rubik's Cube" in the UK as a gift, but not as a toy.

== Later history ==
In 1982 public interest in Rubik's Cube, and in mechanical puzzles generally, plummeted. Dalgety then left Pentangle.

By 1986, Pentangle Puzzles had manufactured over 200 different mechanical puzzles. In 1996 the Pentangle range included more than 40 lines, and the workshop in Over Wallop was producing 3000 puzzles a week, half of which were exported from the UK. Cook developed a sideline in producing branded puzzles for large companies to give as Christmas gifts. One such puzzle, designed for ICI, was called "Excalibur": a sword-shaped letter-opener in a block of wood. The puzzle was, first to release the "sword" from the "stone", and then to decrypt the inscription on its blade so as to learn how to claim a prize.

In 2000, the name of the company was changed to "Payday Games Limited". In 2009 Cook sold the company to Timothy Dixon, who changed its name to "Pentangle Puzzles Limited". Pentangle Puzzles Limited ceased trading in 2018, and was liquidated in 2019.
