= Hexastix =

Geometric structure

- Type: Hexagonal prism arrangement
- Symmetry group: Ia3̅d
- Properties: Non-intersecting, homogenous

Hexastix is a symmetric arrangement of non-intersecting prisms that, when extended infinitely, fill exactly 3/4 of space. The prisms in a hexastix arrangement are all parallel to 4 directions on the body-centered cubic lattice. In The Symmetries of Things, John Horton Conway, Heidi Burgiel, and Chaim Goodman-Strauss named this structure hexastix.

== Applications ==
The hexastix arrangement has found use in mathematics, crystallography, reticular chemistry, puzzle design, and art. Michael O'Keeffe and associates define this structure as one of the 6 possible invariant cubic rod packing arrangements. O'Keefe classifies this arrangement as the Γ or Garnet rod packing, and describes it as the densest possible cubic rod packing. Rod packings are used to classify chains of atoms in crystal structures, and in the develop of materials like metal–organic frameworks. It has been proposed that stratum corneum's structure could be modeled using the hexastix cylinder packing geometry. Hexastix geometry has also found use in architecture, being used to construct a 3-story bamboo structure in Ecuador. In recreational mathematics, the hexastix arrangement can be found in the design of mechanical burr puzzles. Stewart Coffin has used this geometry in the creation of complex non-rectilinear wooden puzzles. In art, hexastix is used by artist Anduriel Widmark to create complex glass knots. Hexastix is also seen in the sculpture titled "72 Pencils", made by math artist George W. Hart.

== Related structures ==
Non-intersecting prism arrangements with prime cubic symmetry make up the family "polystix". Related square and triangular prism structures in three and four directions are named by Conway as tetrastix and "tristix". If the ends of the prisms in a hexastix arrangement are pointed, the directionality modifies the symmetry, and the related structure is known as hexastakes. Rod packings with more directions are also possible, as in the quasi-periodic 6 directional rod packing. The Hexahemioctacron is similarly made from hexagonal prisms but unlike hexastix, the prisms are intersecting.

== See also ==
- Tetrastix
- Stick puzzle
