= Anduriel Widmark =

American visual artist (born 1987)

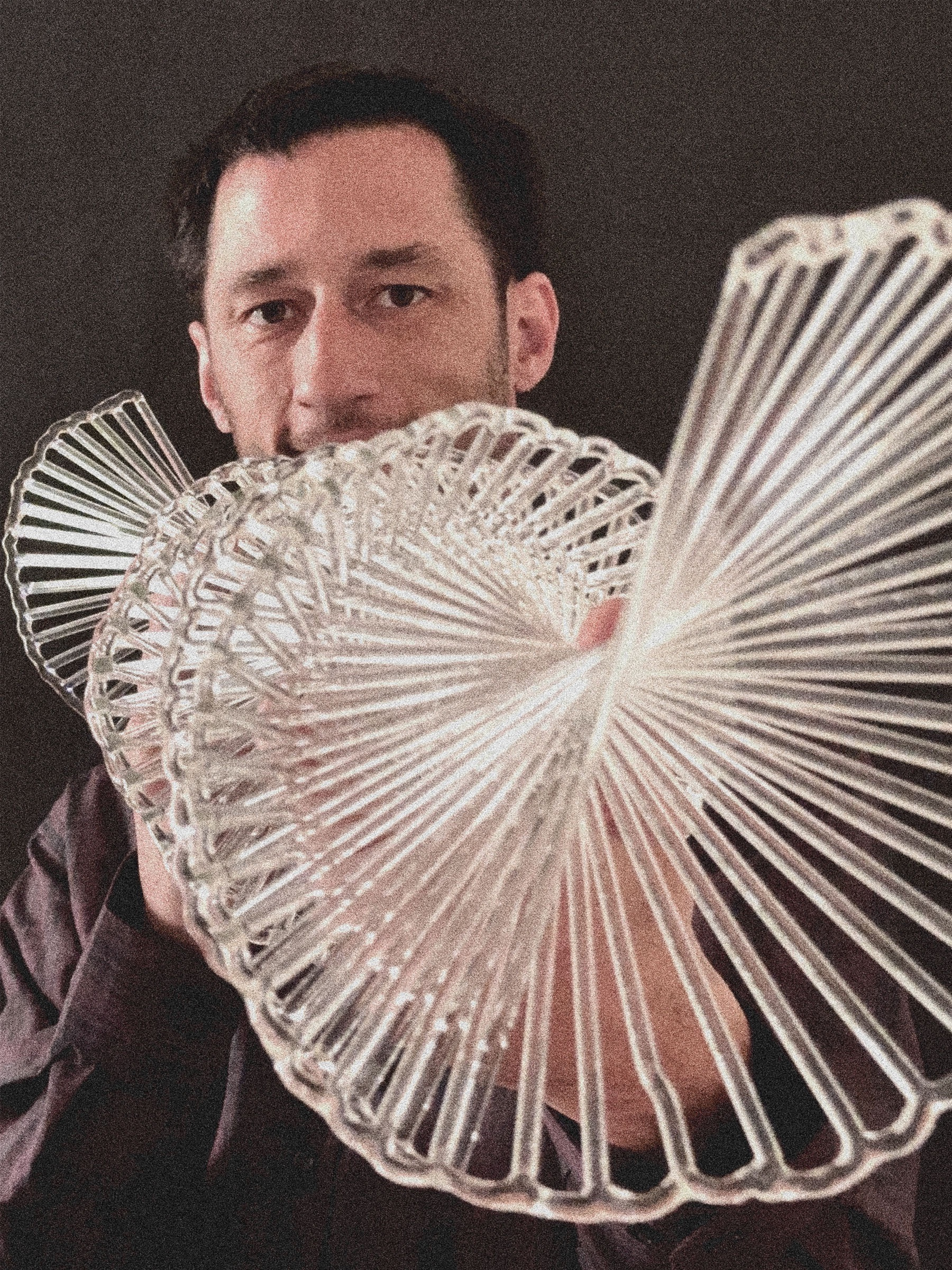
- Anduriel Widmark with glass sculpture
- Born: 1987 (age 38–39); Denver, Colorado
- Known for: glass art, mathematical art
- Website: www.andurielstudios.com

Anduriel Widmark (born 1987) is an American visual artist based in Denver, Colorado. He is known for his work with mathematical art and geometric glass sculpture.

== Career ==
Widmark is a visual artist who works in a variety of media, including glass, painting, and video art. He developed an interest in art and mathematics at an early age, and later studied fine art at Metropolitan State University of Denver.

He is known for creating geometric glass sculptures. Using lampworking and glassblowing techniques, he melts glass into precise, symmetrical forms such as Möbius strips, hyperboloids, and helixes. These sculptures are made from clear borosilicate glass, a material commonly used to manufacture scientific apparatus. His mathematical sculptures have been exhibited at mathematics conferences, including the Bridges Conference on Mathematical Art, Sigma Xi, Mathematical Association of America, MathFest, and the Joint Mathematics Meetings.

Several of his works focus on the geometry of Hexastix. In addition to his glass sculptures, Widmark authored the book Polystix Adventures: An Artist’s Guide Through Hexastix and Beyond and has contributed academic papers to the Bridges Conference on Mathematical Art, meetings of the American Mathematical Society, and the Journal of Mathematics and the Arts. These Hexastix projects illustrate connections between mathematics and art.

== Collections ==
Widmark's artworks are held in public and institutional collections, including in the Museum of Glass, the Sandwich Glass Museum, the Stourbridge Glass Museum, the National Bottle Museum, the Rakow Library at the Corning Museum of Glass, the Museum of American Glass in West Virginia, and the image collection of the National Gallery of Art Library.

== Publications ==
- Polystix Adventures: An Artist's Guide Through the Geometry of Hexastix and Beyond. 2024. ISBN 978-1-304-51803-3
- Sculpture Design with Hexastix and Related Non-Intersecting Cylinder Packings. Phonix: Tessellations Publishing, pp. 293–296. 2021. ISBN 978-1-938664-39-7
- Polystix Sculpture Design Revisited. Phonix: Tessellations Publishing, pp. 379–382. 2022. ISBN 978-1-938664-42-7
- Stixhexaknot: a symmetric cylinder arrangement of knotted glass. Journal of Mathematics and the Arts, 14(1–2). 2020. DOI=10.1080/17513472.2020.1734517.
