= Altekruse Puzzle =

Wooden puzzle

The Altekruse Puzzle is a type of burr puzzle invented by Austrian inventor William Altekruse.

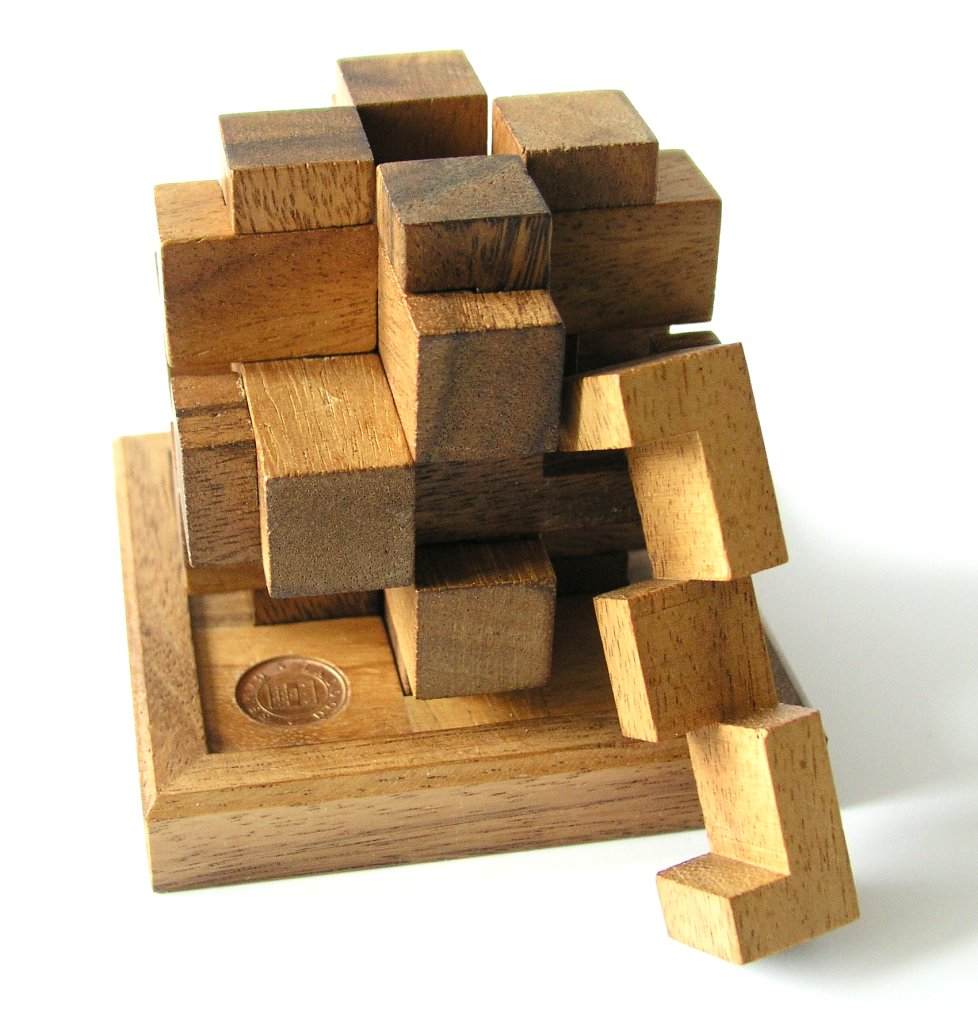
Altekruse Puzzle

== History ==
The puzzle was first released in 1890 and has proved to be very popular ever since.

== Excerpts ==
The Universal Book of Mathematics provides the following information about Altekruse puzzle:

A symmetrical 12-piece burr puzzle for which a patent was granted to William Altekruse in 1890. The Altekruse family is of Austrian-German origin and, curiously, the name means "old cross" in German, which has led some authors to incorrectly assume that it was a pseudonym. William Altekruse came to the United States as a young man in 1844 with his three brothers to escape being drafted into the German army. The Altekruse puzzle has an unusual mechanical action in the first step of disassembly by which two halves move in opposition to each other, unlike the more familiar burr types that have a key piece or pieces. Depending on how it is assembled, this action can take place along one, two, or all three axes independently but not simultaneously.
