= Stick bomb =

Spring-loaded device made from flat sticks

A stick bomb is a (mechanical) spring-loaded device constructed out of flat sticks woven together under a bending moment. Other names for stick bombs include Chinese stick puzzles, Cobra wave, and frame bombs. Stick bombs are created for fun and as art, not for any practical use.

== History ==
A complex stick bomb exploding.

Simple stick bombs made out of four, five, or six sticks have been known to schoolchildren for ages. They were often known as "Chinese stick puzzles", which indicates a possible origin for the devices. Tibor Tarnai describes in 1989 several designs, including those with indefinite size which he credits to Andy Ruina of Cornell University. Ruina claims to have invented the "infinite popsicle-stick bomb" in 1971. In the early 1980s, Tim Fort, known professionally as the Kinetic King, independently invented the multi-celled stick bomb. He also invented all of the stick-bomb weaves currently used including the ortho weave, the diamond weave, and the slant weave; using tongue depressors instead of Popsicle sticks is also credited as one of his innovations. In early 2011, he debuted the cobra weave, the most popular weave, during the Minneapolis audition episode of America's Got Talent. Fort developed methods for making three-dimensional stick bombs as well.

== Guinness Book of World Records ==
The current world record for the world's largest stick bomb is 68,480 sticks and was achieved by a group from Natick, Massachusetts known as the Natick High School Bomb Squad. The record was previously held by a group from Austria in 2015 as well as a group from Lakeview, Oregon in 2014.

== Technical aspects ==
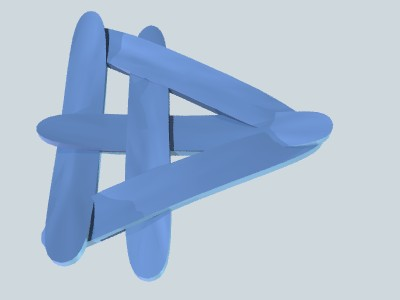
An ice pop stick bomb, ready to throw

Stick bombs can be constructed out of most flat sticks of the appropriate dimensions. The usual material for construction is wood, but plastic can also be used. Ice pop sticks (craft sticks) and tongue depressors are popular because of availability, low cost, and because they are easily coloured. Tongue depressor sticks are strongly recommended for construction as they have lower tension than craft sticks and thus are easier to work with.

The sticks are woven together to form a reticulated grid with each stick held in place by a bending moment created by the elasticity of wood or other material. If constructed properly, the removal of a single stick causes the other sticks to fly apart with surprising force. The speed of the shock wave depends on the materials used.

The variety of configurations in which stick bombs can be constructed is virtually limitless, and there are several tricks (stunts) that can be incorporated into the design. For reasons of structural stability, each stick is touching at least three other sticks in a frame bomb.
