= Matchstick puzzle =

Puzzle involving the arrangement of matchsticks

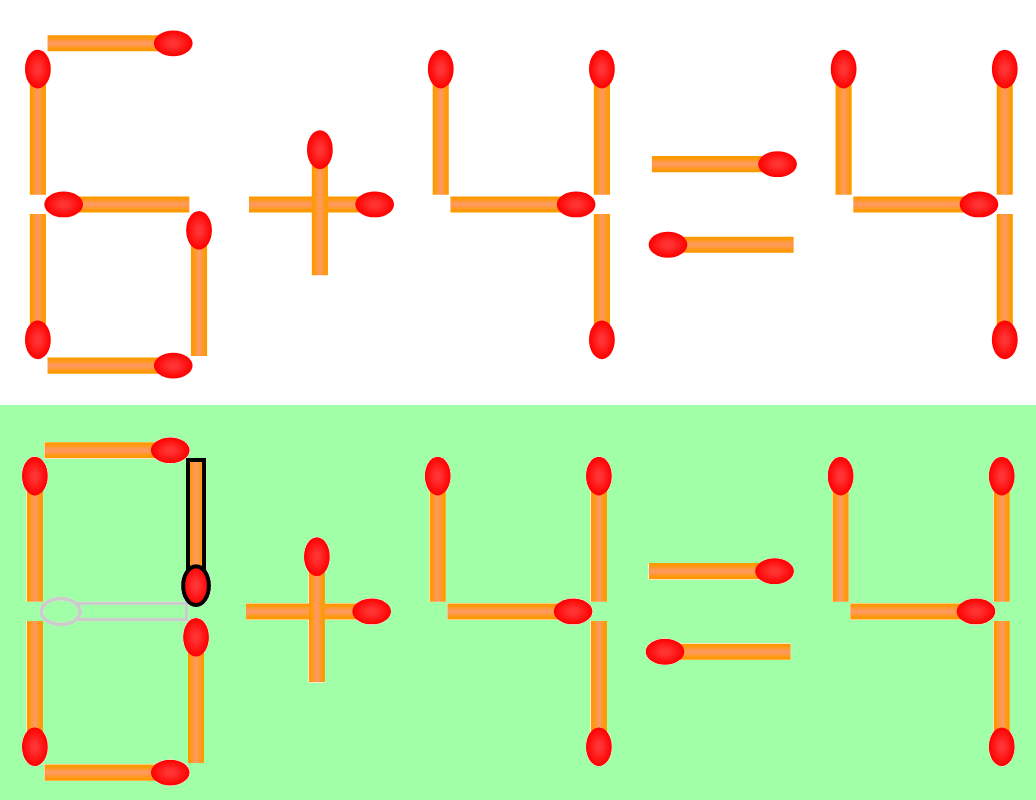
A matchstick puzzle ("Move 1 matchstick to make the equation 6+4=4 valid") and its solution below

Matchstick puzzles are rearrangement puzzles in which a number of matchsticks are arranged into shapes or numbers, and the problem to solve is usually formulated as moving a fixed number of matchsticks to achieve some specific other arrangement.

The puzzles may ask the solver to alter some mathematical equation, often with numbers represented as Roman numerals, or Arabic numerals in a seven-segment display typeface. Other puzzles challenge the solver to rearrange a crude matchstick picture.

Some matchstick puzzles require lateral thinking, such as changing a number into a mathematical symbol.

Puzzles may also be set with no starting position, simply challenging the solver to create an arrangement using a number of matches. One example that requires lateral thinking is to form four equilateral triangles from six matches; this can only be done by arranging the matches in a three-dimensional pyramid shape.
