= Tetrastix =

Space-filling system of square prisms

Tetrastix arrangement showing 6 sticks in each direction

In geometry, it is possible to fill 3/4 of the volume of three-dimensional Euclidean space by three sets of infinitely-long square prisms aligned with the three coordinate axes, leaving cubical voids. John Horton Conway, Heidi Burgiel and Chaim Goodman-Strauss have named this structure tetrastix.

== Applications ==
The motivation for some of the early studies of this structure was its applications in the crystallography of crystal structures formed by rod-shaped molecules.

Shrinking the square cross-sections of the prisms slightly causes the remaining space, consisting of the cubical voids, to become linked up into a single polyhedral set, bounded by axis-parallel faces. Polyhedra constructed in this way from finitely many prisms provide examples of axis-parallel polyhedra with $n$ vertices and faces that require $\Omega(n^{3/2})$ pieces when subdivided into convex pieces; they have been called Thurston polyhedra, after William Thurston, who suggested using these shapes for this lower bound application. Like the Schönhardt polyhedron, these polyhedra have no triangulation into tetrahedra unless additional vertices are introduced.

Anduriel Widmark has used the tetrastix and hexastix structures as the basis for artworks made from glass rods, fused to form tangled knots.

== Related structures ==
The space occupied by the union of the prisms can be divided into the prisms of the tetrastix structure in two different ways. If the prisms are divided into unit cubes, offset by half a unit from the integer grid aligned with the prism sides, then these cubes together with the unit cube voids of the tetrastix structure form a tiling of space by cubes, combinatorially equivalent to the Weaire–Phelan structure for tiling space with unit volumes of low surface area. The tetrastix and Weaire–Phelan structures have the same group of symmetries. Although this cube tiling includes some cubes (the ones filling the voids of the tetrastix) that do not meet face-to-face with any other cube, results of Oskar Perron on Keller's conjecture prove that (like the cubes within each prism of the tetrastix) every tiling of three-dimensional space by unit cubes must include an infinite column of cubes that all meet face-to-face.

Similar constructions to the tetrastix are possible with triangular and hexagonal prisms, in four directions, called by Conway et al. "tristix" and hexastix.

== See also ==
- Mucube, a self-complementary structure formed by the union of three sets of axis-parallel infinite square prisms that intersect in cubes
- Blue phase mode LCD
- Burr puzzle
- Hexastix
