= Blue phase mode LCD =

Type of liquid crystal display

A blue phase mode LCD is a liquid crystal display (LCD) technology that uses highly twisted cholesteric phases in a blue phase. It was first proposed in 2007 to obtain a better display of moving images with, for example, frame rates of 100–120 Hz to improve the temporal response of LCDs. This operational mode for LCDs also does not require anisotropic alignment layers (e.g., rubbed polyimide) and thus theoretically simplifies the LCD manufacturing process.

== History ==
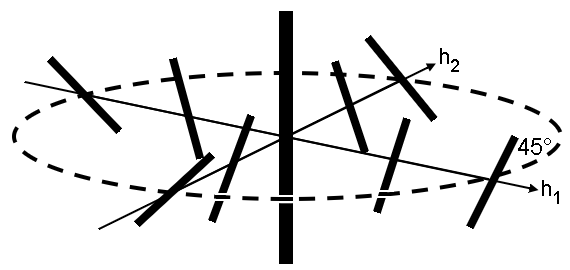
Figure 1: Perspective view on a double twisted structure with two helical axes, h_{1} and h_{2}. The directors perform a rotation of 90° across the diameter.

In Reinitzer's reports from 1888 on the melting behaviour of cholesteryl benzoate, there is a note that the substance briefly turned blue as it changed from clear to cloudy upon cooling. This subtle effect remained unexplored for more than 80 years until experimental results were published during the late 1960s and early 1970s that indicated that the blue color was due to at least two new and very different liquid crystalline phases.

For almost 100 years, scientists assumed that the most stable cholesteric helical structure could be described by a single helical axis about which the director rotates. It turned out that in the new structure the director rotates in a helical fashion about any axis perpendicular to a line as illustrated in fig. 1. Although an unlimited number of helical axes are actually present, this structure was named double twist structure.

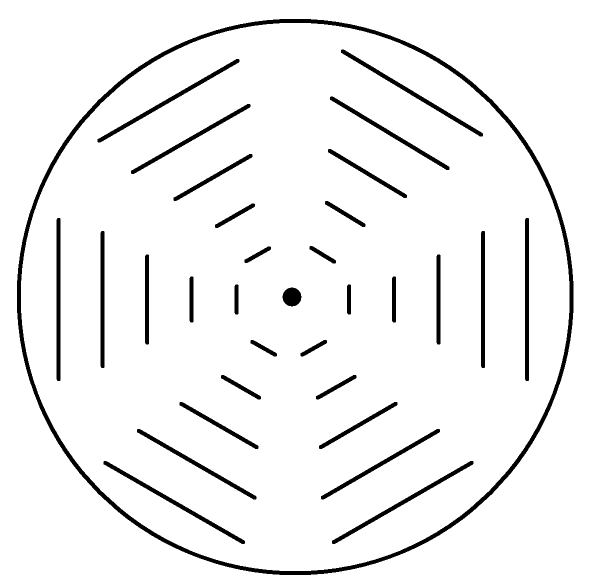
Figure 2: Top view on a double twist cylinder. The plane containing the various helical axes, h, (three of them shown here) is the plane of the figure. The director points out of the plane of the figure in the center and it rotates as you move away from the center.

This double twist structure is more stable than the single twist structure (i.e., the normal helical structure of chiral nematics) only up to a certain distance from the line at the center. Since this distance is on the order of the pitch of the chiral nematic liquid crystal (typically 100 nm) and since the geometries of usual liquid crystal samples are much larger, the double twist structure occurs only rarely.

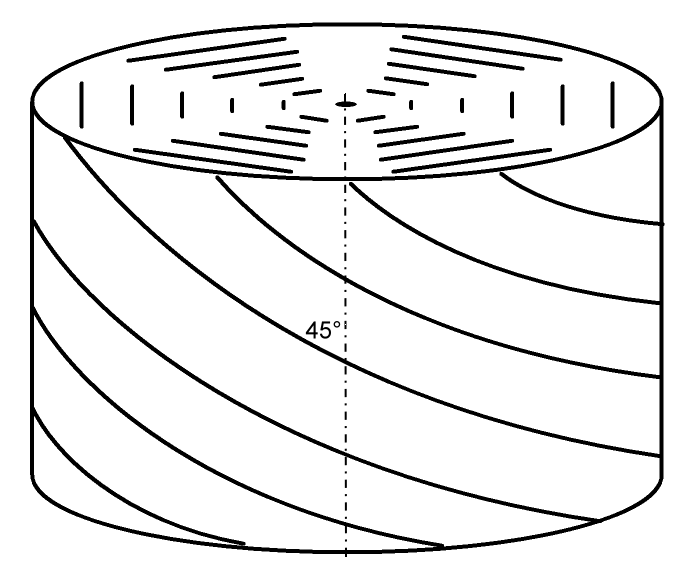
Figure 3: Perspective view on the double twist cylinder. The lines on the outside are supposed to indicate a 45° rotation of the director at that distance from the center line.

Blue phases are special cases when double twist structures fill up large volumes. When double twist structures are limited in all directions to the distance from the center line where the twist amounts to 45° a double twist cylinder results. Because of its small radius, such a cylinder is more stable than the same volume filled with a single twist chiral nematic liquid crystal.

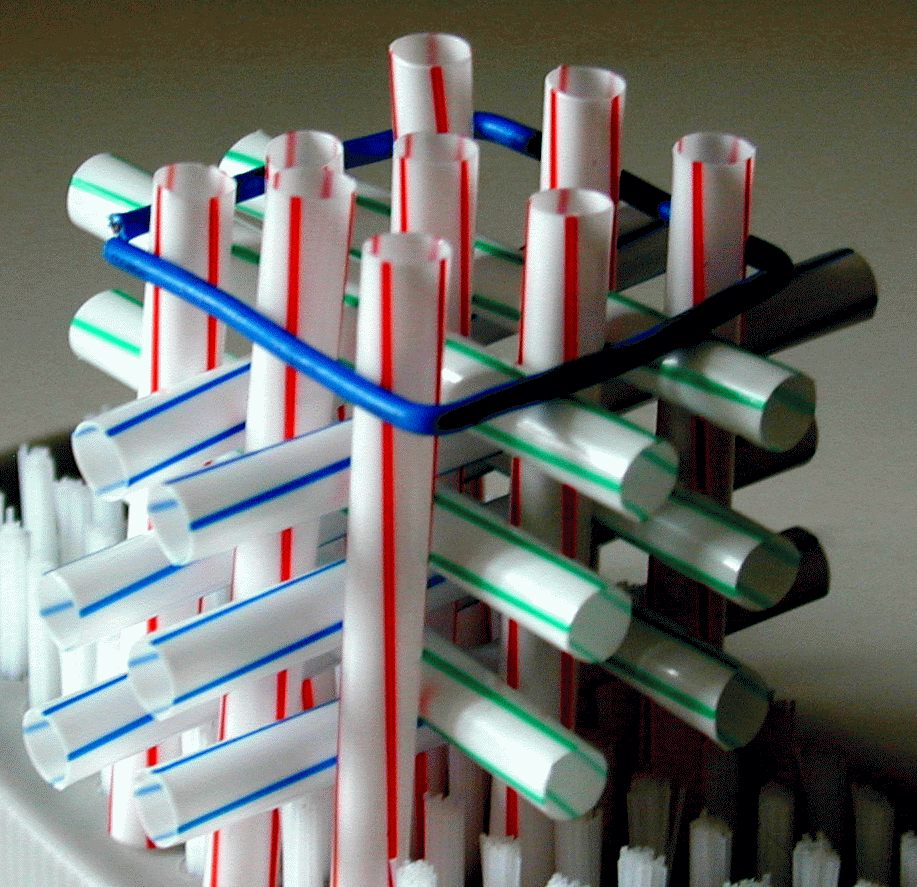
Figure 4: Illustration of a cubic lattice formed by double twist cylinders. All angles are supposed to be right angles.

A large structure can be composed from these double twist cylinders, but defects occur at the points where the cylinders are in contact as illustrated in fig. 5. These defects occur at regular distances and tend to make the structure less stable, but it is still slightly more stable than the single twist structure without defects, at least within a temperature range of about 1 K below the transition from the chiral nematic phase to an isotropic liquid.

The defects that occur at regular distances in three spatial dimensions form a cubic lattice just as we know it from solid crystals. Blue phases are thus formed by a regular three-dimensional lattice of defects within a chiral liquid crystal. Since the spacings between the defects of a blue phase are in the range of the wavelength of light (several hundred nanometers), for certain wavelength ranges of the light reflected from the lattice constructive interference occurs (Bragg reflection) and the blue phase reflects colored light (note that only some of the blue phases actually reflect blue light).

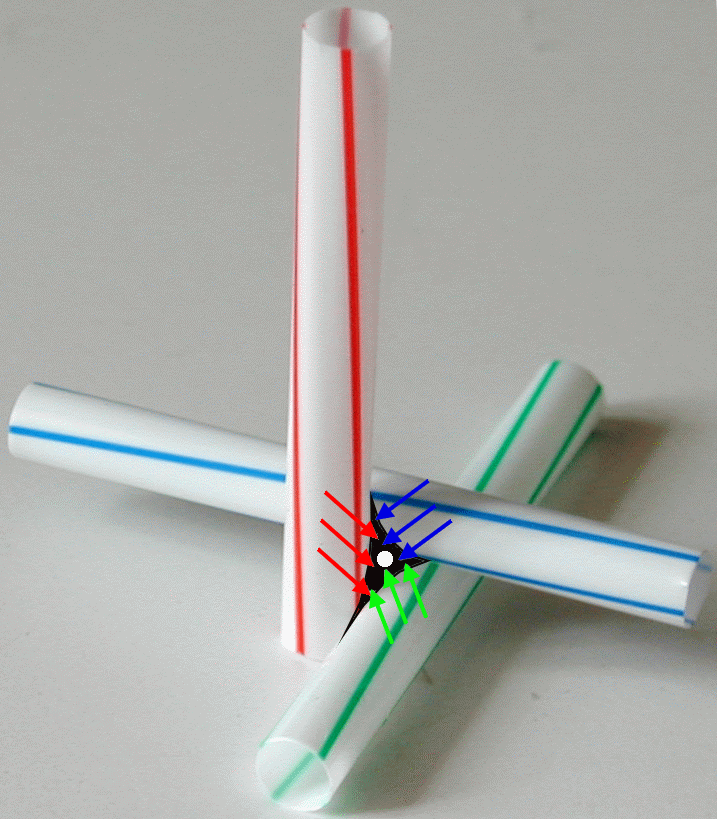
Figure 5: Disclinations form where the double twist cylinders are in contact. The core of the disclination as it crosses the triangular area is shown as a white dot.

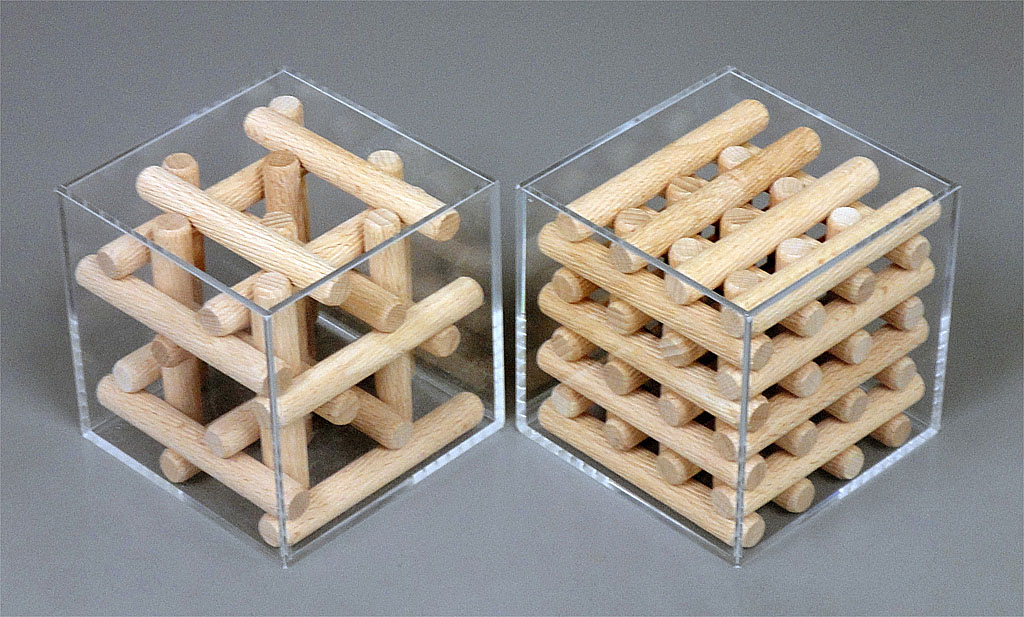
Figure 6: Structures of double twisted cylinders in liquid crystal blue phase I (left) and II (right).

== Wide temperature range blue phases ==
In 2005, researchers from the Centre of Molecular Materials for Photonics and Electronics at the University of Cambridge reported their discovery of a class of blue-phase liquid crystals that remain stable over a range of temperatures as wide as 16-60 °C. The researchers showed that their ultrastable blue phases could be used to switch the color of the reflected light by applying an electric field to the material, and that this could eventually be used to produce three-color (red, green, and blue) pixels for full-color displays. The new blue phases are made from molecules in which two stiff, rod-like segments are linked by a flexible chain, and are believed to be stabilized due to flexoelectricity.

Furthermore, electro-optical switching with response times of the order of 10^{−4} s for the stabilized blue phases at room temperature has been shown.

Blue Phase crystals are regarded as 3D photonic crystals, as they possess a periodic cubic structure in the nanometer range with a selective bandgap in the visible wavelengths. However, standard blue phase crystal manufacturing produces polycrystalline samples, the single crystal size being in the micrometer range. Recently, blue phases obtained as ideal 3D photonic crystals in large volumes have been stabilized with a controlled crystal lattice orientation.

Electro-optical switching from monocrystalline blue phases show increased modulation and less scattering than in polycrystalline samples

== First blue phase LCD ==
In May, 2008 Samsung Electronics announced that it has developed the world's first Blue Phase LCD panel which can be operated at an unprecedented refresh rate of 240 Hz. Samsung unveiled a 15 inch prototype model of its Blue Phase LCD panel at the SID (Society for Information Display) 2008 international Symposium, Seminar and Exhibition, which was held in Los Angeles from May 18 to 23, 2008.

Developed with a look at cost-efficiency, Samsung's Blue Phase mode does not require liquid crystal alignment layers, unlike today's most widely used TFT LCD modes such as Twisted Nematic (TN), In-Plane Switching (IPS) or Vertical Alignment (VA). The Blue Phase mode can make its own alignment layers, eliminating the need for any mechanical alignment and rubbing processes. This reduces the number of required manufacturing steps, resulting in savings on production costs. Additionally it has been claimed that Blue Phase panels would reduce the sensitivity of the liquid crystal layer to mechanical pressure which could impair the lateral uniformity of display (e.g. luminance, chromaticity).

In a blue phase based LCD for TV applications it is not the selective reflection of light according to the lattice pitch (Bragg reflection) that is used for display of visual information, but an external electric field induces a birefringence in the liquid crystal via the Kerr effect. That field induced birefringence becomes apparent as a change of transmission when the Blue Phase Mode LC layer is placed between crossed polarizers.

For a detailed discussion of the blue phase LCs in in-plane switching (IPS) structures and related modeling method based on the Kerr effect in a macroscopic scale, see references. With an isotropic dark state, blue phase LCDs show many notable electro-optic performances. Presently, the driving voltage of blue phase LCs in IPS structures remains slightly too high. Material engineering for developing high Kerr constant mixtures is critically important for reducing the voltage, and device design may also be effective for this purpose; with proper structure design, the driving voltage can be largely reduced.

== See also ==
- Tetrastix
