= Icons of Mathematics =

2011 book by Roger B. Nelsen and Claudi Alsina

- First edition cover
- Author: Roger B. Nelsen and Claudi Alsina
- Language: English
- Series: Dolciani Mathematical Expositions
- Subject: elementary geometry
- Genre: Mathematics
- Publisher: Mathematical Association of America
- Publication date: 2011
- Publication place: United States

Icons of Mathematics: An Exploration of Twenty Key Images is a book on elementary geometry for a popular audience. It was written by Roger B. Nelsen and Claudi Alsina, and published by the Mathematical Association of America in 2011 as volume 45 of their Dolciani Mathematical Expositions book series.

== Topics ==
Each of the book's 20 chapters begins with an iconic mathematical diagram, and discusses an interrelated set of topics inspired by that diagram, including results in geometry, their proofs and visual demonstrations, background material, biographies of mathematicians, historical illustrations and quotations, and connections to real-world applications.

The topics include:

- The geometry of circles and triangles, star polygons, Platonic solids, and figurate numbers
- The Pythagorean theorem, Thales's theorem on right triangles in semicircles, and geometric interpretations of the arithmetic mean, geometric mean, and harmonic mean
- Dido's problem on surrounding as large an area as possible with a given perimeter, and curves of constant width
- Tessellations, polygon triangulations, and rep-tiles
- Similar figures and spirals
- The mathematics of the yin and yang symbol and other self-complementary shapes, and of tatami arrangements.

== Audience and reception ==
Reviewer E. J. Barbeau recommends the book to high-school level mathematics students and teachers. Cheryl McAllister suggests it as auxiliary material for both high school and general-audience college mathematics courses, and Hans-Wolfgang Henn adds that it also makes enjoyable light reading for professional mathematicians.
