= Koch snowflake =

Fractal curve

External videos
- Koch Snowflake Fractal – Khan Academy

The Koch snowflake on its 7th iteration

The first four iterations of the Koch snowflake

The first seven iterations in animation

Zooming into a vertex of the Koch curve

Zooming into a point that is not a vertex may cause the curve to rotate.

Koch antisnowflake

First four iterations

Sixth iteration

The Koch snowflake (also known as the Koch curve, Koch star, or Koch island) is a fractal curve and one of the earliest fractals to have been described. It is based on the Koch curve, which appeared in a 1904 paper titled "On a Continuous Curve Without Tangents, Constructible from Elementary Geometry" by the Swedish mathematician Helge von Koch.

The Koch snowflake can be built up iteratively, in a sequence of stages. The first stage is an equilateral triangle, and each successive stage is formed by adding outward bends to each side of the previous stage, making smaller equilateral triangles. The areas enclosed by the successive stages in the construction of the snowflake converge to $\tfrac{8}{5}$ times the area of the original triangle, while the perimeters of the successive stages increase without bound. Consequently, the snowflake encloses a finite area, but has an infinite perimeter.

The Koch snowflake has been constructed as an example of a continuous curve where drawing a tangent line to any point is impossible. Unlike the earlier Weierstrass function where the proof was purely analytical, the Koch snowflake was created to be possible to geometrically represent at the time, so that this property could also be seen through "naive intuition".

== Origin and history ==
In his 1904 article, von Koch applies this recursive construction to a line segment, obtaining the curve that forms $\tfrac{1}{3}$ of the boundary of the Koch snowflake. However, the complete snowflake does not appear in the original article published in 1904, nor in the extended 1906 memoir. The Koch snowflake as a closed curve may instead be due to the American mathematician Edward Kasner.

== Construction ==
The Koch snowflake can be constructed by starting with an equilateral triangle, then recursively altering each line segment as follows:

1. divide the line segment into three segments of equal length.
2. draw an equilateral triangle that has the middle segment from step 1 as its base and points outward.
3. remove the line segment that is the base of the triangle from step 2.

The first iteration of this process produces the outline of a hexagram.

The Koch snowflake is the limit approached as the above steps are followed indefinitely. The Koch curve originally described by Helge von Koch is constructed using only one of the three sides of the original triangle. In other words, three Koch curves make a Koch snowflake.

A Koch curve–based representation of a nominally flat surface can similarly be created by repeatedly segmenting each line in a sawtooth pattern of segments with a given angle.

== Properties ==
=== Perimeter of the Koch snowflake ===
The arc length of the Koch snowflake is infinite. To show this, we note that each iteration of the construction is a polygonal approximation of the curve. Thus, it suffices to show that the perimeters of the iterates is unbounded.

The perimeter of the snowflake after $n$ iterations, in terms of the side length $s$ of the original triangle, is

$$3s \cdot {\left(\frac{4}{3}\right)}^n\, ,$$

which diverges to infinity.

=== Area of the Koch snowflake ===
The total area of the snowflake after $n$ iterations is, in terms of the original area $A$ of the original triangle, is the geometric series

$$A\left(1 + \frac{3}{4} \sum_{k=1}^{n} \left(\frac{4}{9}\right)^{k} \right) = A \, \frac{1}{5} \left( 8 - 3 \left(\frac{4}{9}\right)^{n} \right)\, .$$

Taking the limit as $n$ approaches infinity, the area of the Koch snowflake is $\tfrac{8}{5}$ of the area of the original triangle. Expressed in terms of the side length $s$ of the original triangle, this is:
$$\frac{2s^2\sqrt{3}}{5}.$$

==== Solid of revolution ====
The volume of the solid of revolution of the Koch snowflake about an axis of symmetry of the initiating equilateral triangle of unit side is $\frac{11\sqrt{3}}{135} \pi.$

=== Other properties ===
The Koch snowflake is self-replicating with six smaller copies surrounding one larger copy at the center. Hence, it is an irrep-7 irrep-tile (see Rep-tile for discussion).

The Hausdorff dimension of the Koch curve is $d = \tfrac{\ln 4}{\ln 3} \approx 1.26186$. This is greater than that of a line ($=1$) but less than that of Peano's space-filling curve ($=2$).

The Hausdorff measure of the Koch curve $S$ satisfies $0.032 < \mathcal{H}^d(S) < 0.6$, but its exact value is unknown. It is conjectured that $0.528 < \mathcal{H}^d(S) < 0.590$.

It is impossible to draw a tangent line to any point of the curve.

== Representation as a de Rham curve ==
The Koch curve arises as a special case of a de Rham curve. The de Rham curves are mappings of Cantor space into the plane, usually arranged so as to form a continuous curve. Every point on a continuous de Rham curve corresponds to a real number in the unit interval. For the Koch curve, the tips of the snowflake correspond to the dyadic rationals: each tip can be uniquely labeled with a distinct dyadic rational.

== Tessellation of the plane ==
Tessellation by two sizes of Koch snowflake

It is possible to tessellate the plane by copies of Koch snowflakes in two different sizes. However, such a tessellation is not possible using only snowflakes of one size. Since each Koch snowflake in the tessellation can be subdivided into seven smaller snowflakes of two different sizes, it is also possible to find tessellations that use more than two sizes at once. Koch snowflakes and Koch antisnowflakes of the same size may be used to tile the plane.

== Thue–Morse sequence and turtle graphics ==
A turtle graphic is the curve that is generated if an automaton is programmed with a sequence. If the Thue–Morse sequence members are used in order to select program states:

- If $t(n) = 0$, move ahead by one unit,
- If $t(n) = 1$, rotate counterclockwise by an angle of $\tfrac{\pi}{3}$ radians or 60 degrees,

the resulting curve converges to the Koch snowflake.

== Representation as Lindenmayer system ==
The Koch curve can be expressed by the following rewrite system (Lindenmayer system):

Alphabet : F
Constants : +, −
Axiom : F
Production rules : F → F+F--F+F

Here, F means "draw forward", - means "turn right 60°", and + means "turn left 60°".

To create the Koch snowflake, one would use F--F--F (an equilateral triangle) as the axiom.

== Variants ==
Below are example variants of the Koch snowflake, together with their boundary Hausdorff dimension and structural class of the solid shape.

=== 2D variants ===
| shape | description | boundary dimension 3.d.p. | structural class |
|---|---|---|---|
| | The Cesàro fractal is composed of four Koch curves in a square base. Here shown with 60° bend angle. | 1.262 (log_{3}4) | tree |
| | Recursively added squares | 1.465 (log_{3}5) | tree-solid |
| | Recursively removed squares generates a Vicsek fractal | 1.465 (log_{3}5) | void-tree |

=== 3D variants ===
3D analogues of the Koch snowflake, sometimes referred to as 'snowballs', share the method of repeatedly adding a protrusion to the parent facet's centre.

| shape | description | boundary dimension 3.d.p. | structural class |
|---|---|---|---|
| | Meyer snowball: recursively added cubes | 2.335 (log_{3}13) | tree-shell |
| | Fractal tetrahedron 1/2 scale | 2.585 (log_{2}6) | tree-solid |
| | Fractal tetrahedron 1/4 scale | 2.085 (log_{4}18) | tree |
| | Pyramidal surface on rhombic dodecahedron | 2.253 | tree |
| | Inverted pyramidal surface on rhombic dodecahedron | 2.253 | shell-tree |

=== Functionalisation ===
Graph of the Koch's function

In addition to the curve, the paper by Helge von Koch that has established the Koch curve shows a variation of the curve as an example of a continuous everywhere yet nowhere differentiable function that was possible to represent geometrically at the time. From the base straight line, represented as AB, the graph can be drawn by recursively applying the following on each line segment:

- Divide the line segment (XY) into three parts of equal length, divided by dots C and E.
- Draw a line DM, where M is the middle point of CE, and DM is perpendicular to the initial base of AB, having the length of $\frac{CE\sqrt{3}}{2}$.
- Draw the lines CD and DE and erase the lines CE and DM.

Each point of AB can be shown to converge to a single height. If $y = \phi(x)$ is defined as the distance of that point to the initial base, then $\phi(x)$ as a function is continuous everywhere and differentiable nowhere.

== Applications ==
Because the Koch snowflake has a finite area but an infinitely long boundary, it serves as a model for designs that require maximized perimeter or surface length within limited space. In antenna engineering, incorporating a Koch-type fractal design increases the perimeter of the material that transmits or receives electromagnetic radiation, allowing the construction of compact antennas suited to confined or complex circuit layouts. In acoustic engineering, a Koch snowflake-inspired acoustic metasurface has been tested for broadband sound diffusion in automotive cabins. The Koch snowflake geometry has also been applied to enhance heat transfer performance in double-pipe heat exchangers.

== See also ==
- List of fractals by Hausdorff dimension
- Gabriel's Horn (infinite surface area but encloses a finite volume)
- Gosper curve (also known as the Peano–Gosper curve or flowsnake)
- Osgood curve
- Self-similarity
- Teragon
- Weierstrass function
- Coastline paradox
