= Equilateral triangle =

Shape with three equal sides

- An equilateral triangle. Curved segment lines denote the internal angle, all of which is 60°. Single slashes indicate all edges are equal in length.
- Type: isosceles triangle regular polygon simplex
- Edges and vertices: 3
- Schläfli symbol: $\{3\}$
- Symmetry group: $\mathrm{D}_3$ of order six
- Area: a quarter of the square root of 3 × side^{2}
- Internal angle (degrees): π/3 (60°)
- Perimeter: 3 × side

An equilateral triangle is a triangle with three sides of equal length and three equal angles. It is a regular polygon, occasionally known as the regular triangle. It is a special case of an isosceles triangle by modern definition. Its internal angle is 60 degrees or π/3 radians. Its perimeter is three times the side length. Its area is a quarter of the square root of three multiplied with its squared side length. Its appearance is unchanged by three reflection lines, each of which passing through a vertex to the midpoint of the opposite edge, and three rotations around its centroid (0°, 120°, 240°); this property is related to the dihedral group of order 6 in algebra.

Applications of an equilateral triangle are in popular culture, architecture, and other science fields such as the resemblance of the trigonal planar molecular geometry in stereochemistry, ternary plots in several fields, Einthoven's triangle in electrocardiography, as a solution of the Thomson problem and of the celestial mechanics's three-body problem, the Laser Interferometer Space Antenna's three identical observatory of gravitational waves spacecraft, and triangulation concept in satellite geodesy.

The two tessellation's instances are the triangular tiling where six equilateral triangles surrounds a common vertex, and the sphinx tiling as a special case of the polyiamond. Classes of polyhedra with equilateral triangles as their faces are deltahedra and the family of uniform antiprisms. The interconnection between equilateral triangles and topics in number theory are the Padovan sequence and the triangular numbers. Fractal shapes that are generated by equilateral triangles iteratively are the Sierpiński triangle and the Koch snowflake. An equilateral triangle can have three arcs on its sides, a result of the Reuleaux triangle

Many theorems, inequalities, and problems involve equilateral triangles. For example, Napoleon's theorem stated that the centroid of three equilateral triangles arranged to form the sides of an arbitrary triangle form an equilateral triangle.

== Applications ==
=== In popular culture ===
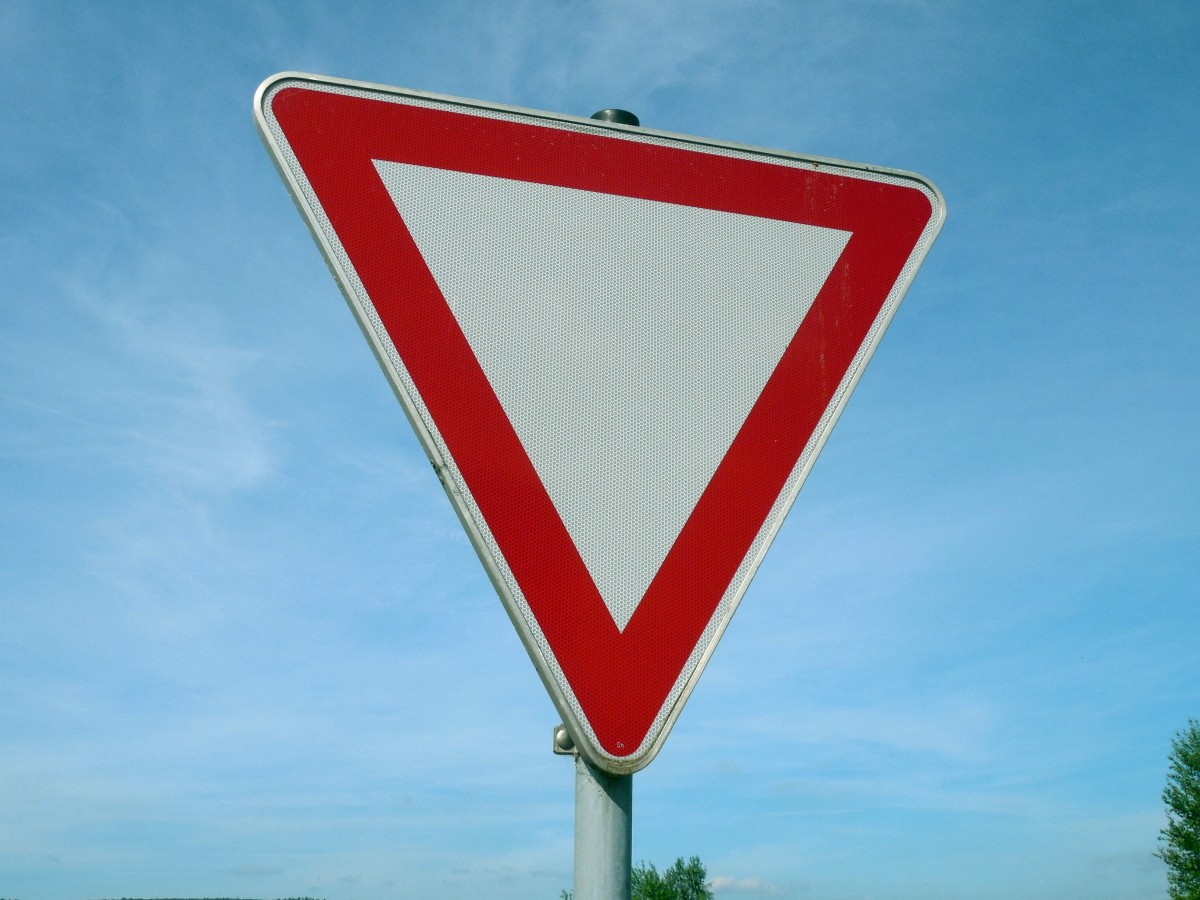
Equilateral triangle usage as a yield sign

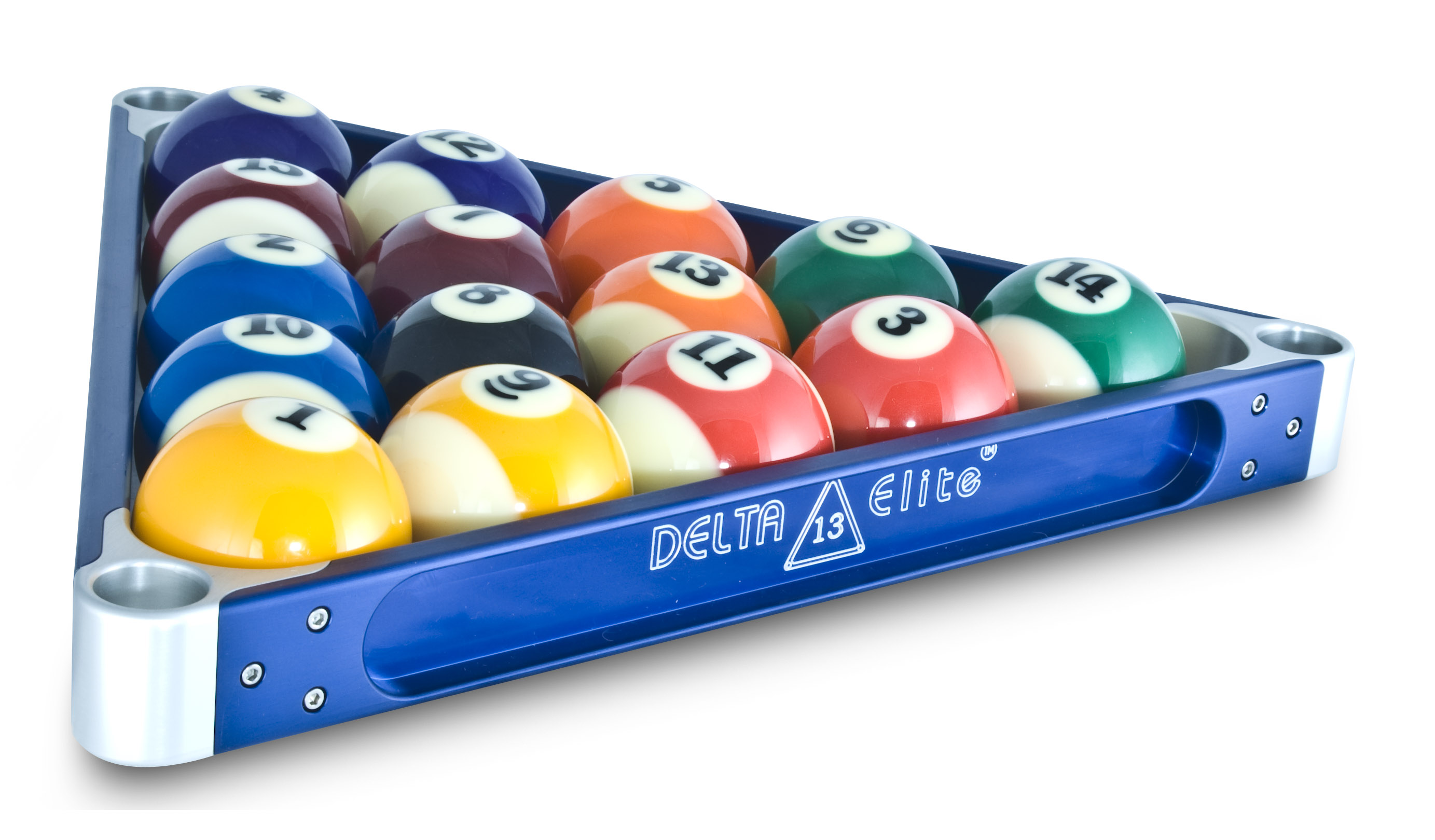
A triangular rack

In architecture, an example can be seen in the cross-section of the Gateway Arch, the surface of the Vegreville egg, and the cathedral Sant'Ivo alla Sapienza floor plan.

The cue sports of 8-ball pool arranged fifteen object balls with a tool of an equilateral triangular shaped rack. The chess variants, namely tri-chess and triangular chess, invented by George R. Dekle Sr. in 1986, have boards with an equilateral triangular grid.

Symbols that adopted equilateral triangles are the particular road signs of the yield sign, the flag of Nicaragua and the Philippines, Tau Kappa Epsilon's fraternity, The Holy Royal Arch's Triple Tau, and the Seal of Solomon.

=== In ternary plot ===
The ternary plot of flammability diagram, showing which mixtures of methane, oxygen gas, and inert nitrogen gas burn

The ternary plot depicts an equilateral triangular graph where the ratios of the three variables represent the positions within. For instances, the flammability diagram depicts the control of flammability and three variables of the graph represent the mixtures of fuel, oxygen, and inert gas. The color triangle with additive primary colors of red, green, and blue by Scottish physicist and mathematician James Clerk Maxwell uses the equilateral triangular modelled graph, as does the one where the vertices represent the color of blue, yellow, and red by German polymath Johann Wolfgang von Goethe. Several geological ternary plots are the United States Department of Agriculture's twelve major classification of soil textures composed of sand, silt, and clay, and the QFL diagram—which stands for quartz, feldspar, and lithic fragments—on compositional data from sandstones and sands where point counted via the Gazzi-Dickinson method.

The plot has different names such as the de Finetti diagram in the mathematical modellilng of population genetics, and a simplex plot in game theory and convex optimization.

=== In astrophysics ===
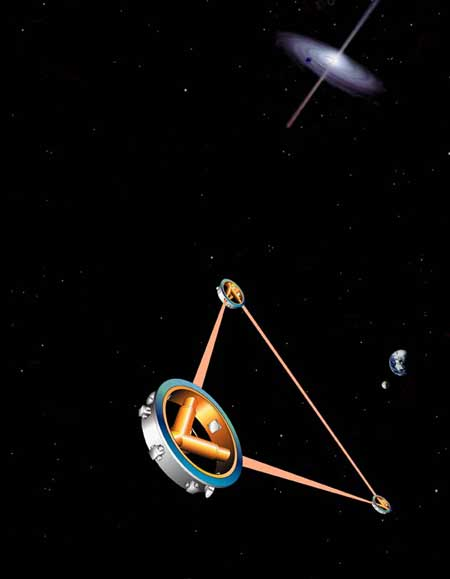
Artist's impression of the space-borne gravitational wave detector Laser Interferometer Space Antenna

In celestial mechanics, the three-body problem refers to the study of three point masses's initial positions, velocities, or even momenta orbiting each other in space, and the calculation of their trajectories afterwards. A special case is that these three masses form an isosceles triangle. However, a study by Italian-French mathematician Joseph-Louis Lagrange provided a solution that these masses form an equilateral triangle, which is nowadays called the Lagrange points.

The Laser Interferometer Space Antenna is a planned European space mission as the observatory of gravitational waves coming from supermassive black holes and binary stars in galaxies. The concept is to launch three identical spacecraft arranged in an equilateral triangle in which each side has a distance of 5 million kilometers (approximately to 3.1 million miles) orbiting the Sun following Earth.

=== In other sciences and technology ===
In the study of stereochemistry, the equilateral triangle is describable as the molecular geometry in which one atom in the center connects three other atoms in a plane, known as the trigonal planar molecular geometry. An example with such a shape is formaldehyde.

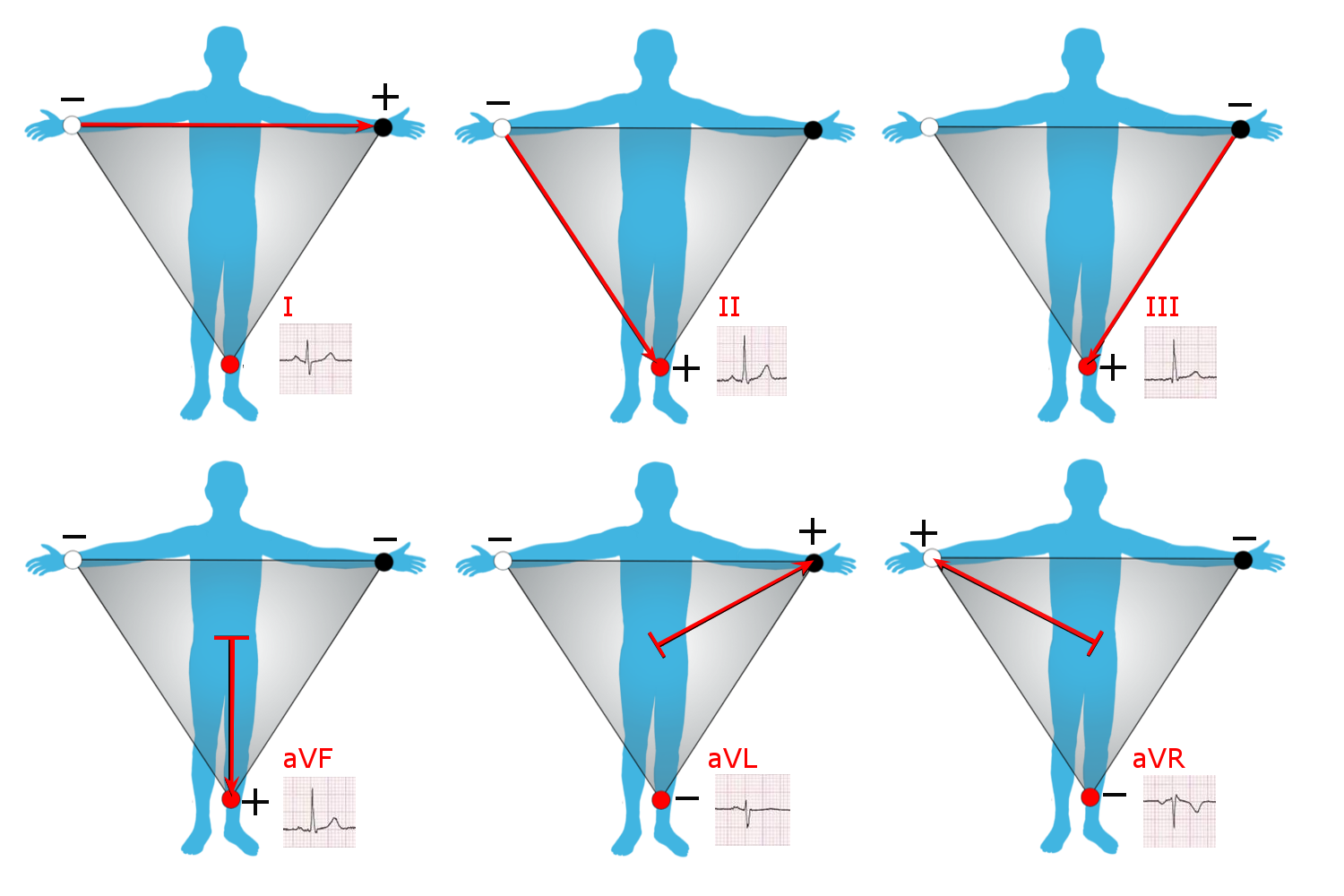
Graphical representation of Einthoven's triangle

In electrocardiography, the formation of an imaginary inverted triangle by two arms and the leg with the chest as its center, and this triangle is called Einthoven's triangle, named after Dutch medical doctor and psychology Willem Einthoven.

In the Thomson problem, concerning the minimum-energy configuration of $n$ charged particles on a sphere, and for the Tammes problem of constructing a spherical code maximizing the smallest distance among the points, the best solution known for $n=3$ places the points at the vertices of an equilateral triangle, inscribed in the sphere. This configuration is proven optimal for the Tammes problem, but a rigorous solution to this instance of the Thomson problem is unknown.

The usage of an equilateral triangle in satellite geodesy was performed in 1962 when George M. Cole verified the accuracy of the triangulation's concept in the continent of North America. To do so, the United States Coast and Geodetic Survey founded three observation stations at Aberdeen in Maryland, Chandler in Minnesota, and Greenville in Mississippi in order to detect NASA ECHO I communications satellite orbiting Earth. The successful operation was subsequently continued to strengthen the network in three countries: the United States (which includes the mainland and the state of Alaska), Canada, and the islands of Antigua and Bermuda.

== Definition and characterizations ==
A triangle is said to be equilateral if and only if it has three equal sides and three equal internal angles; those angles are 60°. For this reason, the equilateral triangle is a regular polygon, and occasionally called the "regular triangle". The equilateral triangle is symbolically denoted as $\{3\}$ by Schläfli notation.

An equilateral triangle is a special case of an isosceles triangle in the modern definition, stating that an isosceles triangle is defined at least as having two equal sides. Based on the modern definition, this leads to an equilateral triangle in which one of the three sides may be considered its base. Consequently, since the perimeter of an isosceles triangle is the sum of its two legs and base, the equilateral triangle with side length $t$ is formulated as three times its side $p = 3t$. In addition, the cevians of an equilateral triangle are all equal in length, resulting in the median and angle bisector being equal in length, considering those lines as their altitude depending on the base's choice.

== Properties ==
=== Area ===
The right triangle with a hypotenuse $AC$ of $2$ has an altitude $AM$ of $\sqrt{3}$, $AC$ times the sine of 60°.

The area of an equilateral triangle $T$ with edge length $t$ is a quarter of the square root of three multiplied with a squared side. That is,
$$T = \frac{\sqrt{3}}{4}t^2.$$
The formula is derivable from the formula of an isosceles triangle by the Pythagorean theorem: the altitude $h$ of a triangle is the square root of the difference of squares of a side and half of a base. Since the base and the legs are equal, the height is:
$$h = \sqrt{t^2 - \frac{t^2}{4}} = \frac{\sqrt{3}}{2}t.$$
In general, the area of a triangle is half the product of its base and height. The formula for the area of an equilateral triangle can be obtained by substituting the altitude formula.

A version of the isoperimetric inequality for triangles states that the triangle of greatest area among all those with a given perimeter is equilateral. That is, for perimeter $p$ and area $T$, the equality holds for the equilateral triangle:
$$p^2 = 12\sqrt{3}T.$$

=== Symmetry ===
Illustration of the six isometries of an equilateral triangle, preserving its symmetry

The equilateral triangle has the symmetry of a dihedral group $\mathrm{D}_3$ of order six. The group indicates that, with the given three vertices, there are six isometries that can preserve the appearance of an equilateral triangle via the following geometrical transformations:

- Three lines passing through a vertex to an edge's midpoint by flipping it across are acted as reflections.
- Three rotations around its center. The action gives the do-nothing transformation and two rotations by the multiple of one-third of a full turn (0°, 120°, 240°).

=== Incircle and circumcircle ===
The inscribed circle and circumscribed circle with their radius $r$ and $R$, respectively, of an equilateral triangle with side length $t$

The inscribed circle of an equilateral triangle is a circle that is fit inside such a triangle, where it is tangent to the edge of an equilateral triangle. The formula for the inradius is the distance between the centroid of a circle (i.e., the centroid of an equilateral triangle) to the three sides of an equilateral at their midpoints
$$r = \frac{\sqrt{3}t}{6}.$$
The circumscribed circle of an equilateral triangle is a circle that fits an equilateral triangle, where it is tangent to all three vertices of such a triangle. The circumradius is the distance from the centroid of an equilateral triangle to any vertex of the triangle
$$R = \frac{t}{\sqrt{3}}.$$
The area of circles with the given radius $r$ and $R$ are:
$$A_r = \frac{\pi t^2}{12}, \qquad A_R = \frac{\pi t^2}{3}.$$

A theorem of Euler states that the distance $\ell$ between circumcenter and incenter is formulated as $\ell^2 = R(R - 2r)$. As a corollary of this, the equilateral triangle has the smallest ratio of the circumradius $R$ to the inradius $r$ of any triangle. That is:
$$R \ge 2r.$$

Pompeiu's and van Schooten's theorem illustrations

Pompeiu's theorem states that, if $P$ is an arbitrary point in the plane of an equilateral triangle $ABC$ but not on its circumcircle, then there exists a triangle with sides of lengths $PA$, $PB$, and $PC$. That is, $PA$, $PB$, and $PC$ satisfy the triangle inequality that the sum of any two of them is greater than the third. If $P$ is on the circumcircle then the sum of the two smaller ones equals the longest and the triangle has degenerated into a line, this case is known as van Schooten's theorem.

== Constructions ==
Crop of the Ladies' Diary's proof on Napoleon's theorem by the construction of triangles

Let $\triangle ABG$, $\triangle BHC$, and $\triangle ACK$ be some equilateral triangles constructed on the sides of an arbitrary triangle $ABC$. Either all outward or inward, the centers of the three equilateral triangles $D$, $E$, and $F$, respectively form an equilateral triangle $\triangle DEF$. The result is attributed to Emperor of the French Napoleon Bonaparte by many mathematicians, thereby it is named Napoleon's theorem, although Napoleon had no connection to the mathematical works. Along with the similar event of the construction problem on circle and its center by a compass, these two were discovered by Italian geometer and mathematician Lorenzo Mascheroni, who let the Emperor claim them for himself. The Ladies' Diary published 1825 showed a proof of Napoleon's theorem.

An equilateral triangle with circumradius 1 and a side length $\sqrt{3}$ can be constructed in the Cartesian coordinate system with the given equation:
$$\max (-2y, y-x\sqrt{3}, y+x\sqrt{3}) = 1.$$

=== Compass ===
Construction of equilateral triangle with compass and straightedge. Illustration of Euclid's Elements on the compass construction.

The very first proposition in the Elements by Euclid starts by drawing a circle with a certain radius, placing the point of the compass on the circle, and drawing another circle with the same radius; the two circles intersect in two points. An equilateral triangle can be constructed by joining the two centers of the circles and one of the points of intersection.

A regular polygon is constructible by compass and straightedge if and only if the odd prime factors of its number of sides are distinct Fermat primes. There are five known Fermat primes: 3, 5, 17, 257, 65537.

== Related topics ==
Diagram illustrating Ludwig Kiepert's solution to Lemoine's problem

French mathematician Émile Lemoine in 1868 asked whether a triangle can be constructed by the vertex of equilateral triangles attached on the sides of a triangle. The solution was provided by German mathematician Ludwig Kiepert, containing the description of a hyperbola, which is now known as the Kiepert hyperbola.

An equilateral triangle may have integer sides with three rational angles as measured in degrees, known for the only acute triangle that is similar to its orthic triangle (with vertices at the feet of the altitudes), and the only triangle whose Steiner inellipse is a circle (specifically, the incircle). The triangle of the largest area of all those inscribed in a given circle is equilateral, and the triangle of the smallest area of all those circumscribed around a given circle is also equilateral. It is the only regular polygon aside from the square that can be inscribed inside any other regular polygon.

A packing problem asks the objective of $n$ circles packing into the smallest possible equilateral triangle. Optimal solutions are known for packing $n < 13$ circles into an equilateral triangle, and conjecturally optimal solutions for $13 \leq n < 28$.

=== Centroid of and points inside a triangle ===
Morley's triangle and its centers

Let $ABC$ be an arbitrary triangle. Draw the angle trisectors of $A$, $B$, and $C$, angles division that require two lines in order to obtain three equal angles. These lines intersect three points $D$, $E$, and $F$, forming a triangle $DEF$, called "Morley's triangle". Morley's trisector theorem, after Anglo-American mathematician Frank Morley, states that $DEF$ is always equilateral, regardless the edge length of $ABC$. In the Encyclopedia of Triangle Centers on center points in a triangle by Clark Kimberling, Morley's triangle $\triangle DEF$ has two Morley centers, where one is made from the intersection of three altitudes in $\triangle DEF$ and the other one is from the intersection of $AD$, $BE$, and $CF$.

The illustrated proof of Viviani's theorem by rotating the altitude of three inscribed equilateral triangles

Let $\triangle ABC$ be an equilateral triangle and $P$ be any point inside $\triangle ABC$. Let $\triangle DGP$, $\triangle EHP$, and $\triangle FIP$ be some equilateral triangles within $\triangle ABC$. Draw the altitude of those three triangles from the distance between $P$ to the midpoints of $AC$, $BC$, and $AB$, respectively. By rotating these segment lines vertically, the sum of $AC$, $BC$, and $AB$ is equal to the altitude of $\triangle ABC$. This result is from Viviani's theorem, named after Italian mathematician Vincenzo Viviani.

Given a point $P$ in the interior of an equilateral triangle, the ratio of the sum of its distances from the vertices to the sum of its distances from the sides is greater than or equal to 2, equality holding when $P$ is the centroid. In no other triangle is there a point for which this ratio is as small as 2. This is the Erdős–Mordell inequality; a stronger variant of it is Barrow's inequality, which replaces the perpendicular distances to the sides with the distances from $P$ to the points where the angle bisectors of $\angle APB$, $\angle BPC$, and $\angle CPA$ cross the sides; $A$, $B$, and $C$ being the vertices. There are numerous other triangle inequalities that hold equality if and only if the triangle is equilateral.

The Fermat point, constructed

The Fermat point, the "Fermat–Toricelli point", or "the first isogonic center" is a point where the sum of the three distances from each of the three triangle's vertices to the point is possibly the smallest. To construct, draw three equilateral triangles $\triangle ARB$, $\triangle BPC$, and $\triangle AQC$, where the sides $AB$, $BC$, and $AC$ form an arbitrary triangle $ABC$. The Fermat point is the intersection of three segment lines $AP$, $BQ$, and $CR$. This point is named after French mathematician Pierre de Fermat, asking for such a problem to Italian mathematician Evangelista Torricelli. Such a problem provides the solution of the geometric median on an isolated point minimizing the sum of distances to the sample points, later generalized into the famous problem in location theory by German economist Alfred Weber called the Weber problem, and the solution of the minimum Steiner tree problem in combinatorial optimization.

=== Counting ===
The Padovan sequence and the spiral of equilateral triangles

The Padovan sequence is the sequence of integers with the given initial values $P_1 = P_2 = P_3 = 1$ and the recurrence relation
$$P_n = P_{n-2} + P_{n-3}.$$
The resulting recurrence relation generates a sequence consisting of the first few numbers:

1, 1, 1, 2, 2, 3, 4, 5, 7, 9, 12, 16, 21, 28, ... (sequence A000931 in the OEIS)

The Padovan sequence is named after Richard Padovan, who attributed its discovery to Dutch architect Hans van der Laan in his 1994 essay. Geometrically, the sequence is describable as the tiling of equilateral triangles based on the edge length successively, creating a spiral. The result is analogous to the Fibonacci sequence 0, 1, 1, 2, 3, 5, 8, ... with the tiling of squares.

The first six triangular numbers originated from $T_1 = 1$ instead of $T_0 = 0$

The triangular numbers are the type of figurate numbers, the sequence of positive integers that describe geometrically the arrangement of points in an equilateral triangle. Started with one point, continuing with two points, then three points, and so on. The sequence tells the total of points as it goes, and calculating the total for $n$-th term the formula gives $n(n+1)/2$. The first few numbers are:

0, 1, 3, 6, 10, 15, 21, 28, 36, 45, 55, 66, 78, ... (sequence A000217 in the OEIS)

Triangular numbers were applications for Pythagoreanism; for example, tetractys is a triangular figure consisting of ten points arranged in four rows symbolizing the harmony of music and cosmos, the ascent of divines, the classical elements, and the generalization of triangular mathematical spaces called simplices.

=== Fractal ===
The Sierpiński triangle and its algorithm to construct

The Sierpiński triangle is a fractal equilateral triangular shape with holes. In such a context, being a fractal means that the shape is made of an algorithm, performing the removal of the subset of an equilateral triangle, resulting in its three copies within, and everlastingly persisting the process under the same previous rule. The Sierpiński triangle is thereupon an example of a self-similarity set by means of generating the reproducible pattern in any magnification. The Hausdorff dimension measures that it is in terms of ratio of natural logarithms $\ln 3/\ln 2$, approximately 1.585. The fractal shape is named after Polish mathematician Wacław Sierpiński.

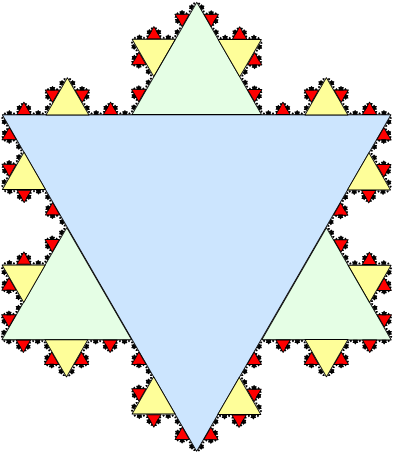
The Koch snowflake, another fractal shape

The Koch snowflake is another fractal shape made of the union of infinitely many equilateral triangles, named after Swedish mathematician Helge von Koch in a 1904 paper. The procedure is recursive. Started by dividing all sides of an equilateral triangle into three equal parts, subsequently drawing three more equilateral triangle at the middle segments before removing them, and then divide two adjacent sides of all three such triangles correspondingly before creating more smaller equilateral triangles again. The iterations yield the number of equilateral triangles as it goes on, representing terms of a sequence 1, 3, 12, 48, et cetera. The origin equilateral triangle has 1 area. The iterated triangles have areas multiplied by $1/9$, and the next iterated ones have areas result from the previous one multiplied by $1/9$; the process continues thereafter. Applying the geometric series, where the initial term and the common ratio is 1 and $4/9$, respectively, brings about the area of Koch snowflake with infinite iterations $8/5$.

=== Curved triangle ===
The Reuleaux triangle by the construction of three circles intersecting each other

The Reuleaux triangle is a curved triangle. The performance begins from the intersection of two same radius circles, named the vesica piscis, and then a third same-sized circle again intersects an even smaller region, ergo the result of the Reuleaux triangle. Alternatively, an equilateral triangle can have three arcs on its three sides, producing the same result. The arcs are the curve of constant width, measured based on two parallel supporting lines with the same Euclidean distance from each other touching the shape without crossing, regardless their orientation. Such a triangular shape is named after a 19th-century German engineer Franz Reuleaux, who apply the shape for study of translating one type of motion into another in a machine, although the mathematical property of constant width was studied, possibly by Swiss mathematician Leonhard Euler.

=== Tessellations ===
The triangular tiling. Every red dot is surrounded by six equilateral triangles. An example of a regular tiling

The snub trihexagonal tiling. Every black dot is surrounded by a regular hexagon and four equilateral triangles. An example of a semiregular tiling.

The sphinx tiling is made of six black equilateral triangles. The shape can be divided into four sphinx tilings in red, yellow, green, and blue. It is an example of rep-tile, meaning that it can self-replicate.

In tessellation, the equilateral triangle covers the Euclidean plane with its copy of the same size, meeting at a vertex surrounded by six triangles. In other words, an equilateral triangle is a prototile to create a triangular tiling. The center of each prototile can be connected to that of its adjacent by a segment line, many of which create hexagonal tilings as its dual tessellation. Both are two of the three regular tilings, with the final one is the square tiling. Being a regular means that a tiling has a symmetry group that acts transitively on its flags; the term "flag" is a triple consisting of its mutually incident vertex, edge and prototile. In this case, the triangular tiling has a wallpaper group $p6m$.

Equilateral triangles can also be tiled with other regular polygons. With regular hexagons, these create the truncated hexagonal tiling, the trihexagonal tiling, and the snub hexagonal tiling. With squares, they create the snub square tiling. With the previous both, they create the rhombitrihexagonal tiling. All tessellations are semi-regular, meaning that all vertices are equivalent under the symmetry of a tiling.

The polyiamond is a tessellation of polyform made of equilateral triangles. One special case of the polyiamond is the sphinx tiling with six equilateral triangles, making up the resultant pentagonal shape in the resemblance of the Great Sphinx at Giza, ergo the name's origin. The latter is an example of a rep-tile by dissecting it into more smaller equilateral triangles, grouping six of those triangles to create more sphinx tilings. Concisely, the sphinx tiling can self-replicate itself.

=== Polytopes ===
The regular octahedron is a deltahedron with eight equilateral triangular faces. It is also a member of the family of antiprisms, where six equilateral triangles are treated as a band, and the remaining as the antiprismatic bases.

Equilateral triangles may also form a three-dimensional polytope, called a polyhedron. A polyhedron whose faces are all equilateral triangles is called a deltahedron. A deltahedron can be either convex or non-convex; a convex polyhedron is made of the intersection of planar polygonal faces. In the case of non-convex, there are infinitely many. However, in the case of convex, there are eight deltahedra: regular tetrahedron, regular octahedron, regular icosahedron, triangular bipyramid, pentagonal bipyramid, snub disphenoid, triaugmented triangular prism, and gyroelongated square bipyramid). The last five solids are part of Johnson solids, convex polyhedra made of regular polygonal faces, and all Johnson solids have equilateral triangles among their faces, though most also have other regular polygons. The antiprisms are a family of polyhedra incorporating a band of alternating triangles. When the antiprism is uniform, its bases are regular and all triangular faces are equilateral.

As a generalization, the equilateral triangle and any other types of a triangle belong to the infinite family of $n$-simplexes, with $n = 2$.

=== Miscellaneous shapes ===
The Fano plane

The Fano plane, named after Italian mathematician Gino Fano, is a projective plane with seven lines and seven points. Each three lines pass through three points and vice versa, making up an equilateral triangle with circle as its standard visualization.

The trihexaflexagon is a folded strip of planar paper model, divided into nine equilateral triangles. Twisting the strip and connect the ends gives a three-twisted Möbius strip. The trihexaflexagon is enantiomorphic, having two different forms.

British and Canadian mathematician H.S.M. Coxeter defined a hollow triangle as an equilateral triangular ring region, or formally speaking, as a planar region bounded by two homothetic and concentric equilateral triangles. Three identical hollow triangles were an application by Australian sculptor John Robinson, whose constructed a sculpture titled Intuition by fitting the triangles each other in cyclic order. The shape is thereupon having a topological property as do the Borromean rings, as well as having the cyclic group permuting such three triangles. A similar independently approach by American artist George Odom with four hollow triangles interlocked mutually, yielding the octahedral group and the geometrical construction by the four-dimensional Cartesian integer coordinates.

== See also ==
- Clifton Cathedral
- Dirichlet distribution
- Eternity puzzle
- Almost-equilateral Heronian triangle
- Hofstadter points
- Illusory contour
- Kingittorsuaq Runestone
- Nesbitt's inequality
- Pipeclay triangle
- Thébault's theorem
- Three Pagodas

Fundamental convex regular and uniform polytopes
Family	A_{n}	B_{n}	I_{2}(p) / D_{n}	E_{6} / E_{7} / E_{8} / F_{4} / G_{2}	H_{n}
Regular polygon	Triangle	Square	p-gon	Hexagon	Pentagon
Uniform polyhedron	Tetrahedron	Octahedron • Cube	Demicube		Dodecahedron • Icosahedron
Uniform polychoron	Pentachoron	16-cell • Tesseract	Demitesseract	24-cell	120-cell • 600-cell
Uniform 5-polytope	5-simplex	5-orthoplex • 5-cube	5-demicube		
Uniform 6-polytope	6-simplex	6-orthoplex • 6-cube	6-demicube	1_{22} • 2_{21}	
Uniform 7-polytope	7-simplex	7-orthoplex • 7-cube	7-demicube	1_{32} • 2_{31} • 3_{21}	
Uniform 8-polytope	8-simplex	8-orthoplex • 8-cube	8-demicube	1_{42} • 2_{41} • 4_{21}	
Uniform n-polytope	n-simplex	n-orthoplex • n-cube	n-demicube	1_{k2} • 2_{k1} • k_{21}	n-pentagonal polytope
Topics: Polytope families • Regular polytope • List of regular polytopes and compounds • Polytope operations
