= Teragon =

Polygon with an infinite number of sides

Creating a teragon, the Koch snowflake

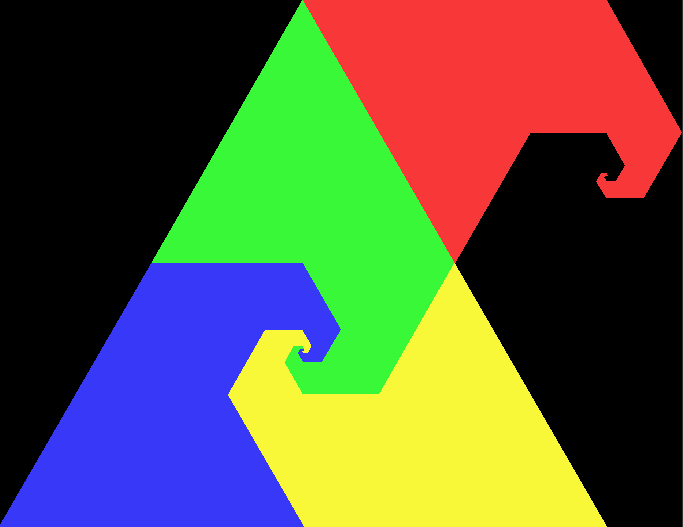
Horned triangle or teragonic triangle

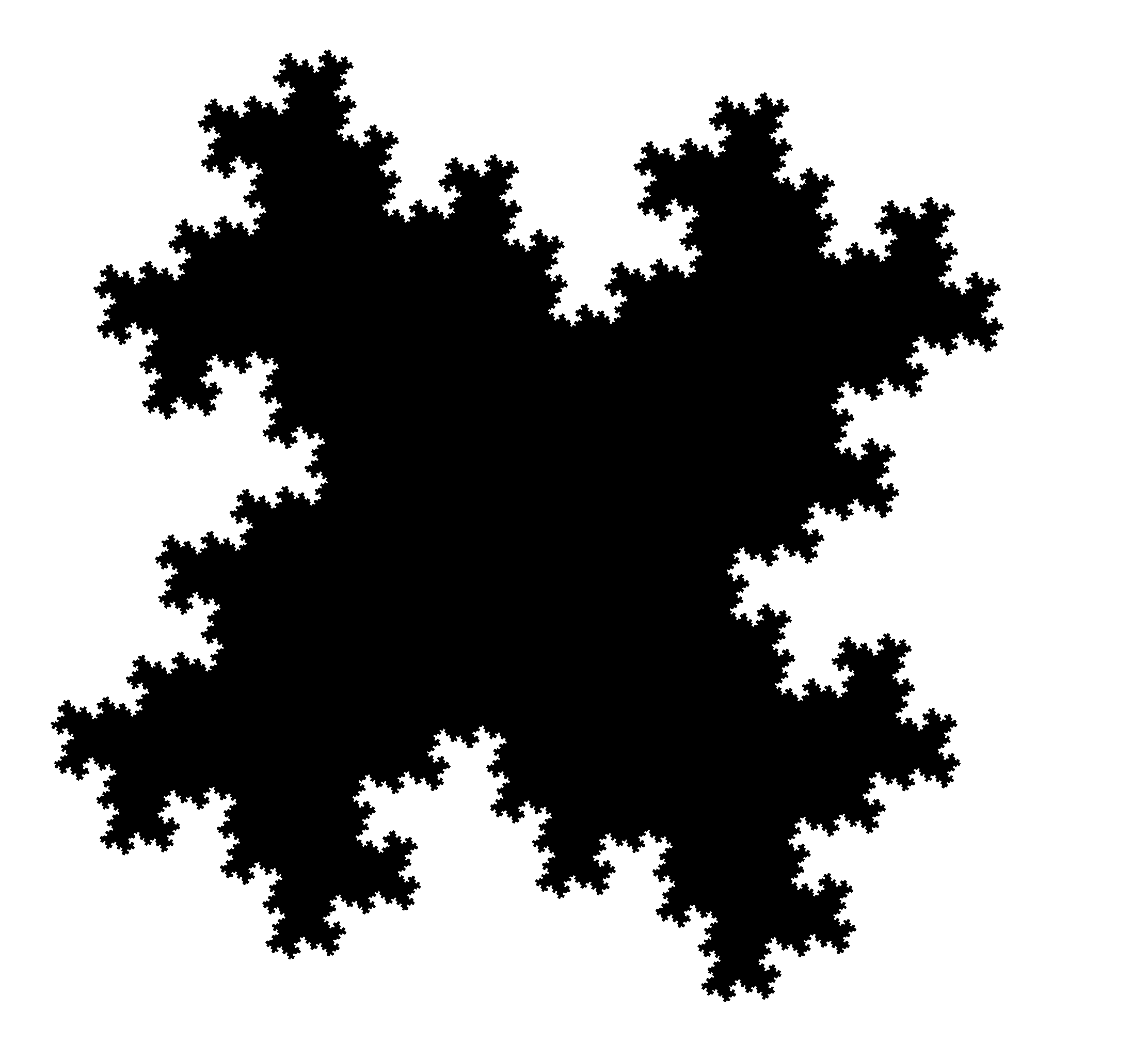
Quadratic Koch island/Minkowski fractal

A teragon is a polygon with an infinite number of sides, the most famous example being the Koch snowflake ("triadic Koch teragon"). The term was coined by Benoît Mandelbrot from the words Classical Greek τέρας (teras, monster) + γωνία (gōnía, corner). Typically, a teragon will be bounded by one or more self-similar fractal curves, which are created by replacing each line segment in an initial figure with multiple connected segments, then replacing each of those segments with the same pattern of segments, then repeating the process an infinite number of times for every line segment in the figure.

== Other examples ==
The horned triangle, created by erecting a series of smaller triangles on one corner of an equilateral triangle, is another example of a teragon. It is also an example of a rep-tile, or shape that can be completely dissected into smaller copies of itself.
