= Pompeiu problem =

Mathematical conjecture

In mathematics, the Pompeiu problem is a conjecture in integral geometry, named for Dimitrie Pompeiu, who posed the problem in 1929. It is stated as follows. Suppose f is a nonzero continuous function defined on a Euclidean space, and K is a simply connected Lipschitz domain, so that the integral of f vanishes on every congruent copy of K. Then the domain is a ball.

== Schiffer's conjecture ==
A closely related and highly significant formulation is Schiffer's conjecture, named after the mathematician Menahem Max Schiffer. While the Pompeiu problem is rooted in integral geometry, Schiffer's conjecture is framed in the language of partial differential equations.

Schiffer's conjecture proposes that if a bounded, simply connected domain $\Omega$ with a sufficiently smooth boundary $\partial \Omega$ admits a non-trivial solution $u$ to the following overdetermined boundary value problem:

$$\begin{cases}\Delta u + \lambda u = 0 \quad &\text{ in }\Omega \\
\frac{\partial u}{\partial n} = 0, \quad &\text{ on } \partial \Omega \\
u = 1, \quad &\text{ on } \partial \Omega
\end{cases}$$

for some eigenvalue $\lambda > 0$ and some constant, then the domain $\Omega$ must be a ball. Balls always admit solutions to such overdetermined value problem. On a ball, one can pick $u$ to be a radially symmetric Neumann eigenfunction of the Laplacian, which will satisfy the first two equations above. Since moreover is radially symmetric, $u$ is constant at $\partial \Omega$, so rescaling the Neumann eigenfunction, one can ensure the third equation as well.

=== Equivalence to the Pompeiu problem ===
The deep connection between the two problems was brought to light by Williams (1976). By utilizing the Fourier transform and techniques from complex analysis, it was proven that Schiffer's conjecture is mathematically equivalent to the Pompeiu problem for the case of $\Omega \subset \mathbb{R}^n$ smooth and contractible.

== Counterexample ==
On August 3, 2026, Matthew Colbrook and George Stepaniants published a preprint establishing a counterexample in two dimensions to the Pompeiu and Schiffer problems, thereby disproving both conjectures. On August 5, 2026, Gonzalo Cao-Labora and Jaume de Dios Pont published a preprint providing an independent construction and a computer-verified proof in Lean 4, developed with assistance from GPT-5.6 and Claude models. Both counterexamples exploit a perturbation argument from the sphere, see joint interactive website for visualizations.
