= Sphinx tiling =

Type of tessallation

Four 'sphinx' hexiamonds can be put together to form another sphinx.

In geometry, the sphinx tiling is a tessellation of the plane using the "sphinx", a pentagonal hexiamond formed by gluing six equilateral triangles together. The resultant shape is named for its reminiscence to the Great Sphinx at Giza. A sphinx can be dissected into any square number of copies of itself, some of them mirror images, and repeating this process leads to a non-periodic tiling of the plane. The sphinx is therefore a rep-tile (a self-replicating tessellation). It is one of few known pentagonal rep-tiles and is the only known pentagonal rep-tile whose sub-copies are equal in size.

Dissection of the sphinx into four sub-copies

Dissection of the sphinx into nine sub-copies

== General tilings ==
An outer boundary ("frame") in the shape of a sphinx can also be tiled in a non-recursive way for all orders. We define the order of a sphinx frame on a triangular lattice by the number of triangles at the "tail" end. An order-2 frame can be tiled by four sphinxes in exactly one way (as shown in the figure), an order-3 frame can be tiled by 9 sphinxes in 4 ways, etc. The number of tilings grows exponentially as $e^{c n^2}$ with the order $n$ of the frame, where $c \approx 0.425$

== See also ==
- Mosaic
