= Pompeiu's theorem =

On line segments from a point to the vertices of an equilateral triangle

Pompeiu's theorem is a result of plane geometry, discovered by the Romanian mathematician Dimitrie Pompeiu. The theorem is simple, but not classical. It states the following:

Given an equilateral triangle ABC in the plane, and a point P in the plane of the triangle ABC, the lengths PA, PB, and PC form the sides of a (maybe, degenerate) triangle.

Proof of Pompeiu's theorem with Pompeiu triangle $\triangle PCP'$

The proof is quick. Consider a rotation of 60° about the point B. Assume A maps to C, and P maps to P′. Then PB = P′B, and ∠PBP′ = 60°. Hence triangle PBP′ is equilateral and PP′ = PB. Then PA = P′C. Thus, triangle PCP′ has sides equal to PA, PB, and PC and the proof by construction is complete (see drawing).

Further investigations reveal that if P is not in the interior of the triangle, but rather on the circumcircle, then PA, PB, PC form a degenerate triangle, with the largest being equal to the sum of the others; this observation is also known as Van Schooten's theorem.

Generally, by the point P and the lengths to the vertices of the equilateral triangle – PA, PB, and PC two equilateral triangles (the larger and the smaller) with sides a_{1} and a_{2} are defined:

$$a_{1,2}^2 = \frac{1}{2} \left( PA^2 + PB^2 + PC^2 \pm 4\sqrt{3}\triangle_{(PA,PB,PC)} \right) .$$

The symbol △ denotes the area of the triangle whose sides have lengths PA, PB, PC.

Pompeiu published the theorem in 1936; however August Ferdinand Möbius had already published a more general theorem about four points in the Euclidean plane in 1852. In this paper Möbius also derived the statement of Pompeiu's theorem explicitly as a special case of his more general theorem. For this reason, the theorem is also known as the Möbius–Pompeiu theorem.
