= Triangular chess (game) =

Chess variant

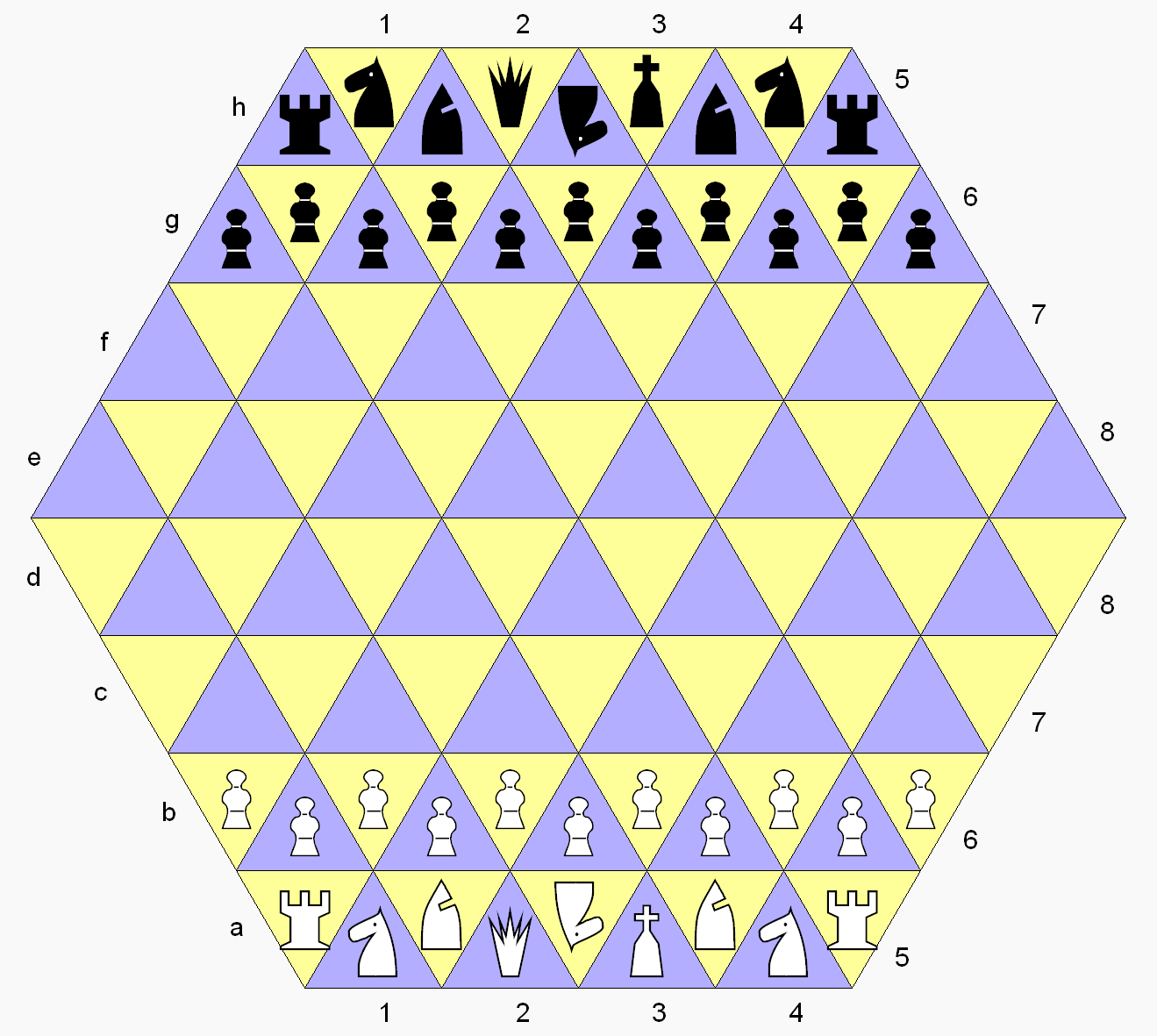
Triangular chess gameboard and starting position

Triangular chess is a chess variant for two players invented by George R. Dekle Sr. in 1986. The game is played on a hexagon-shaped gameboard comprising 96 triangular cells. Each player commands a full set of chess pieces in addition to three extra pawns and a unicorn.

Triangular chess and its variation tri-chess were included in World Game Review No. 10 edited by Michael Keller.

== Game rules ==
The starting setup is as shown. As in chess, White moves first, and the object is checkmate. Other standard conventions apply as well, including castling, the pawn's initial two-step move, the en passant capture, and promotion at the last rank. The triangular geometry, however, implies special move patterns for the pieces.

=== Piece moves ===
- A rook moves in a straight line starting through a cell edge. (Three directions are possible.)
- A bishop moves in a straight line starting through a cell vertex. (Three directions, can be able to switch cell colors.)
- The queen moves as a rook or bishop. (Six directions.)
- The king moves one step as a queen. When castling, the king slides two cells if castling short (0-0); three cells if castling long (0-0-0).
- A knight moves in the pattern: two steps as a bishop, then one step as a rook in an orthogonal direction. A knight leaps any intervening men.
- The unicorn moves in the pattern: two steps as a rook, then one step as a rook in an orthogonal direction. Like a knight, the unicorn leaps any intervening men.
- A pawn moves straight forward one step at a time, whether crossing a cell edge or vertex. On its first move it may optionally move two steps straight forward. A pawn captures to either cell adjoining the cell immediately in front, in the same rank.
- If a pawn reaches a board edge where no step straight forward exists, the pawn continues to advance toward promotion using its capture move (whether there are men to capture or not).
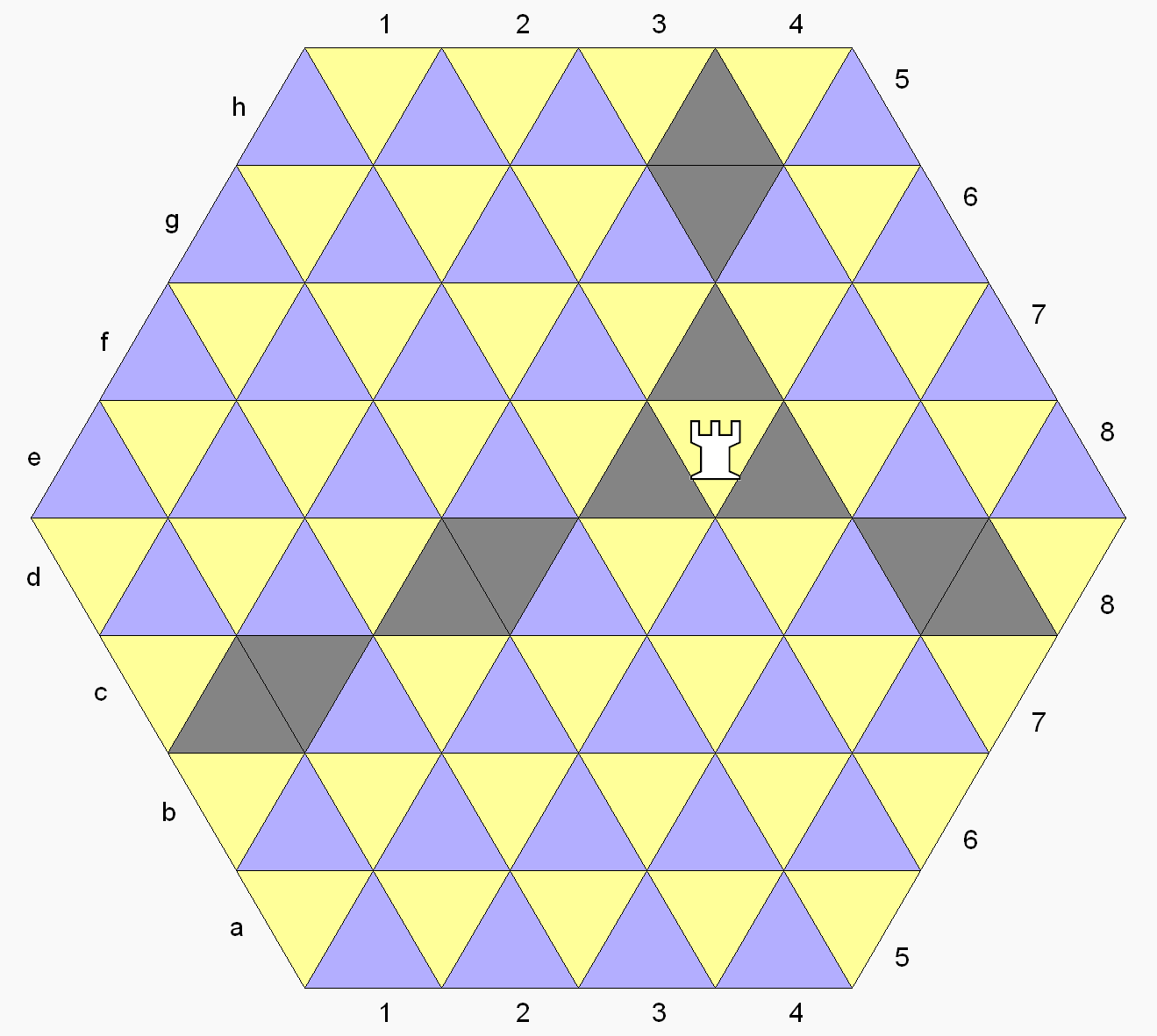
Rook moves

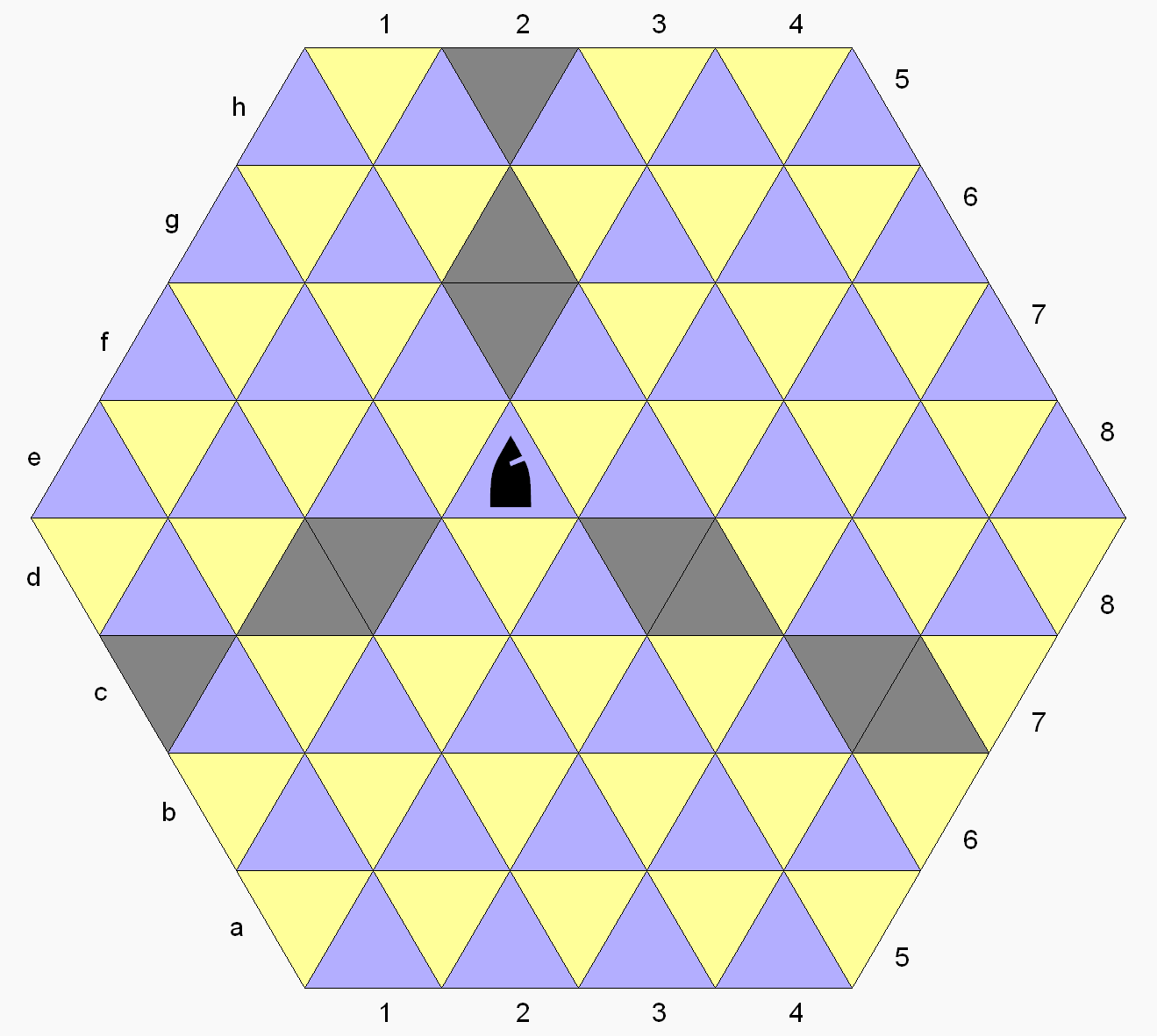
Bishop moves

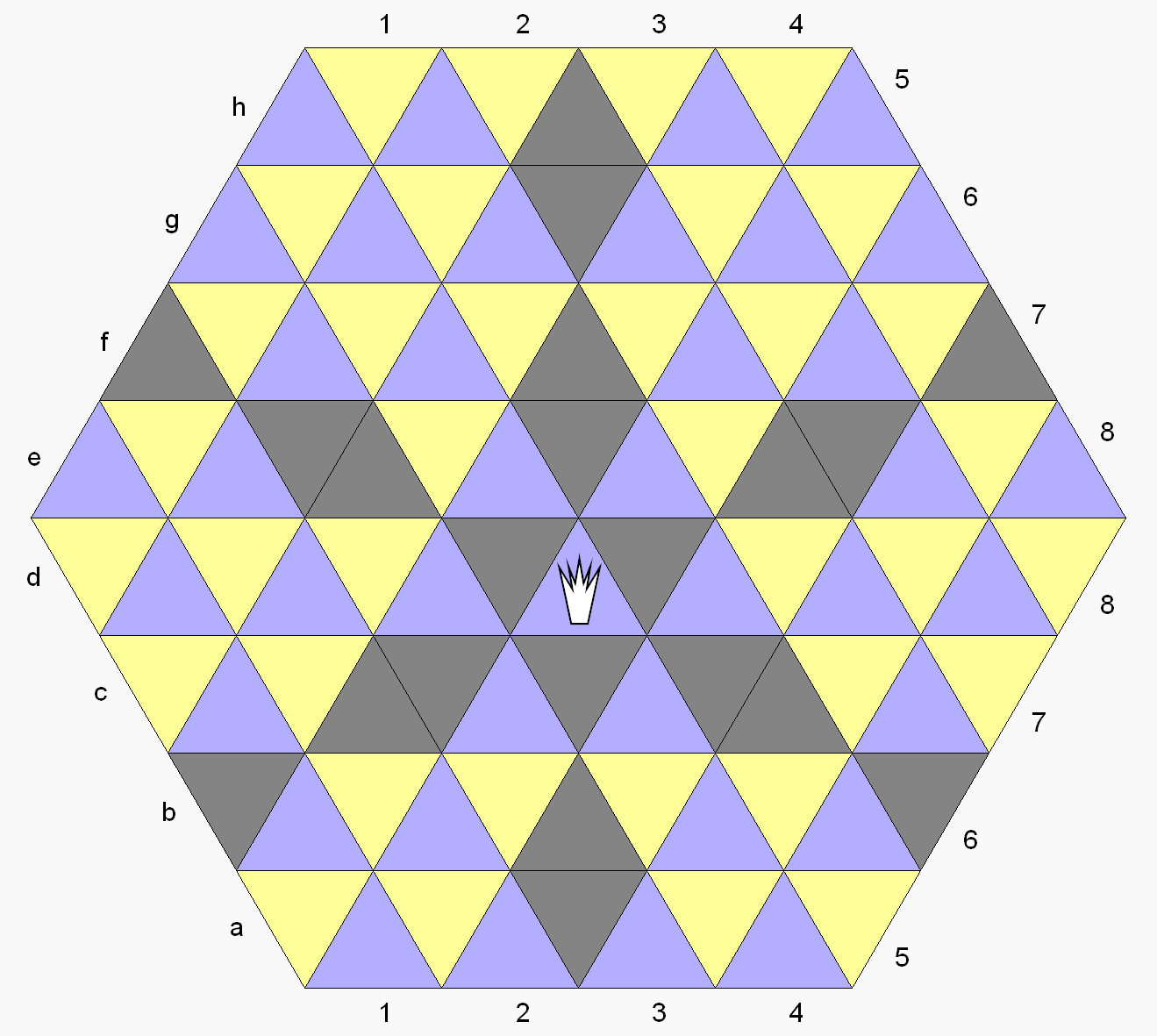
Queen moves

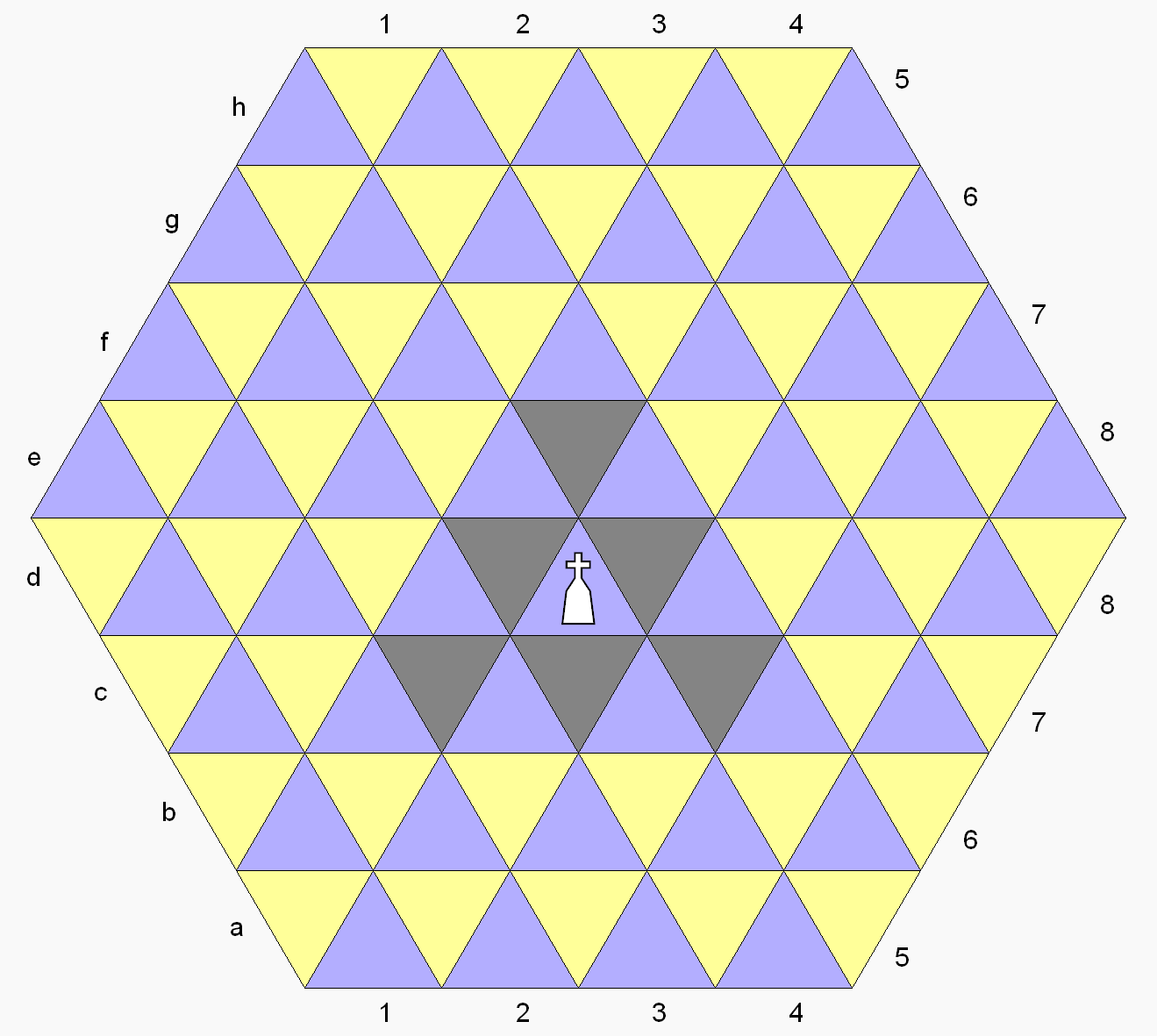
King moves

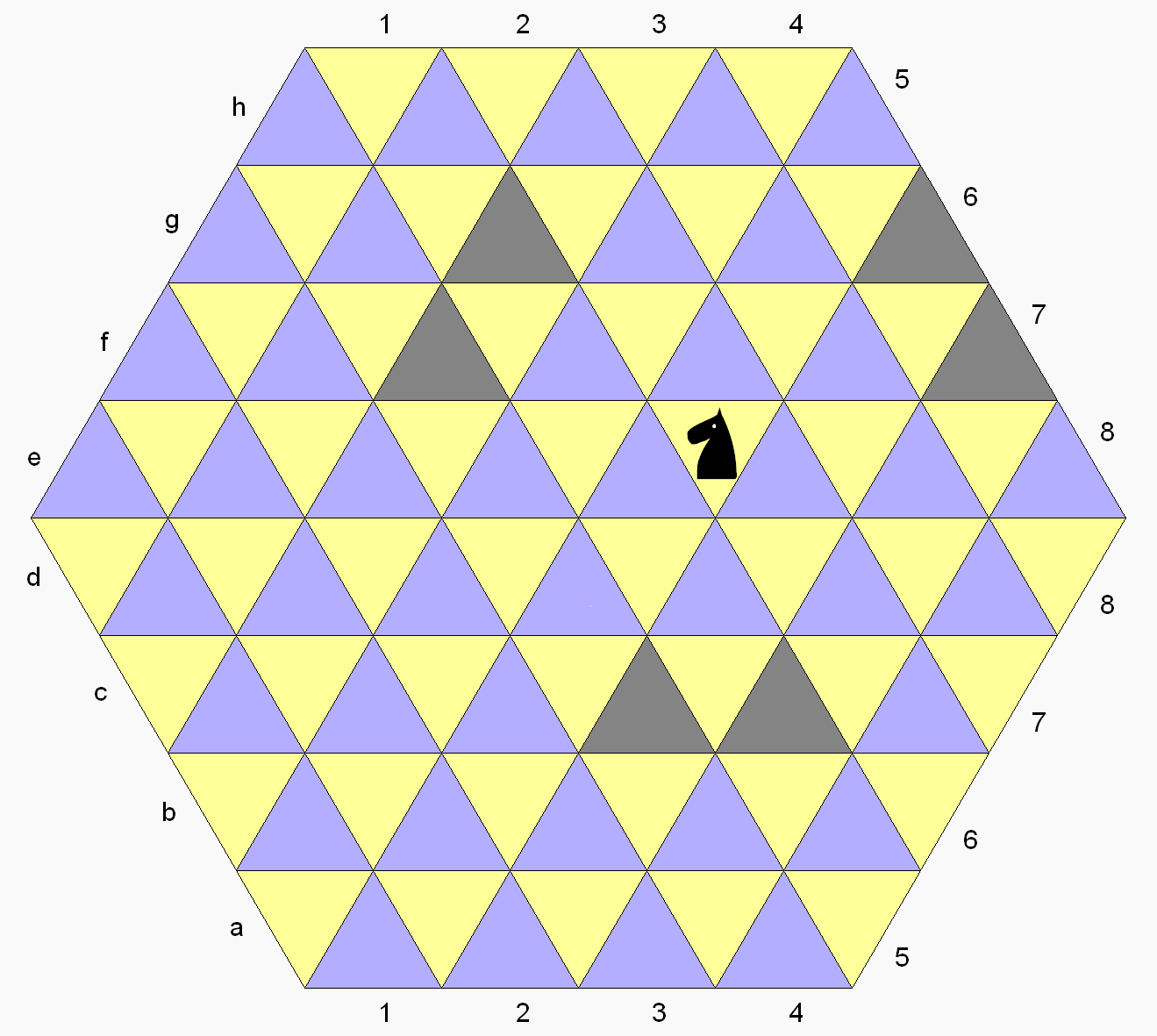
Knight moves

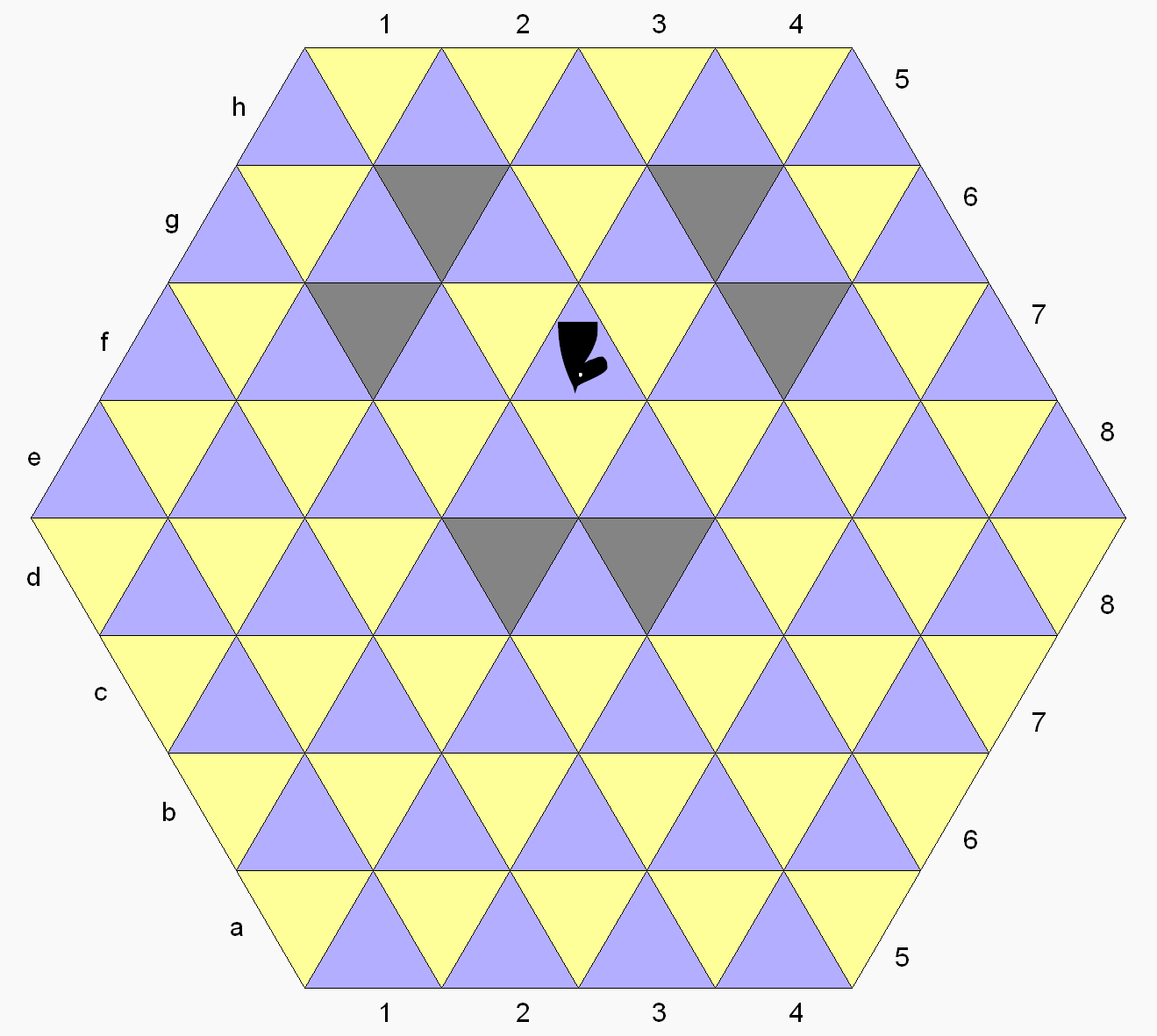
Unicorn moves

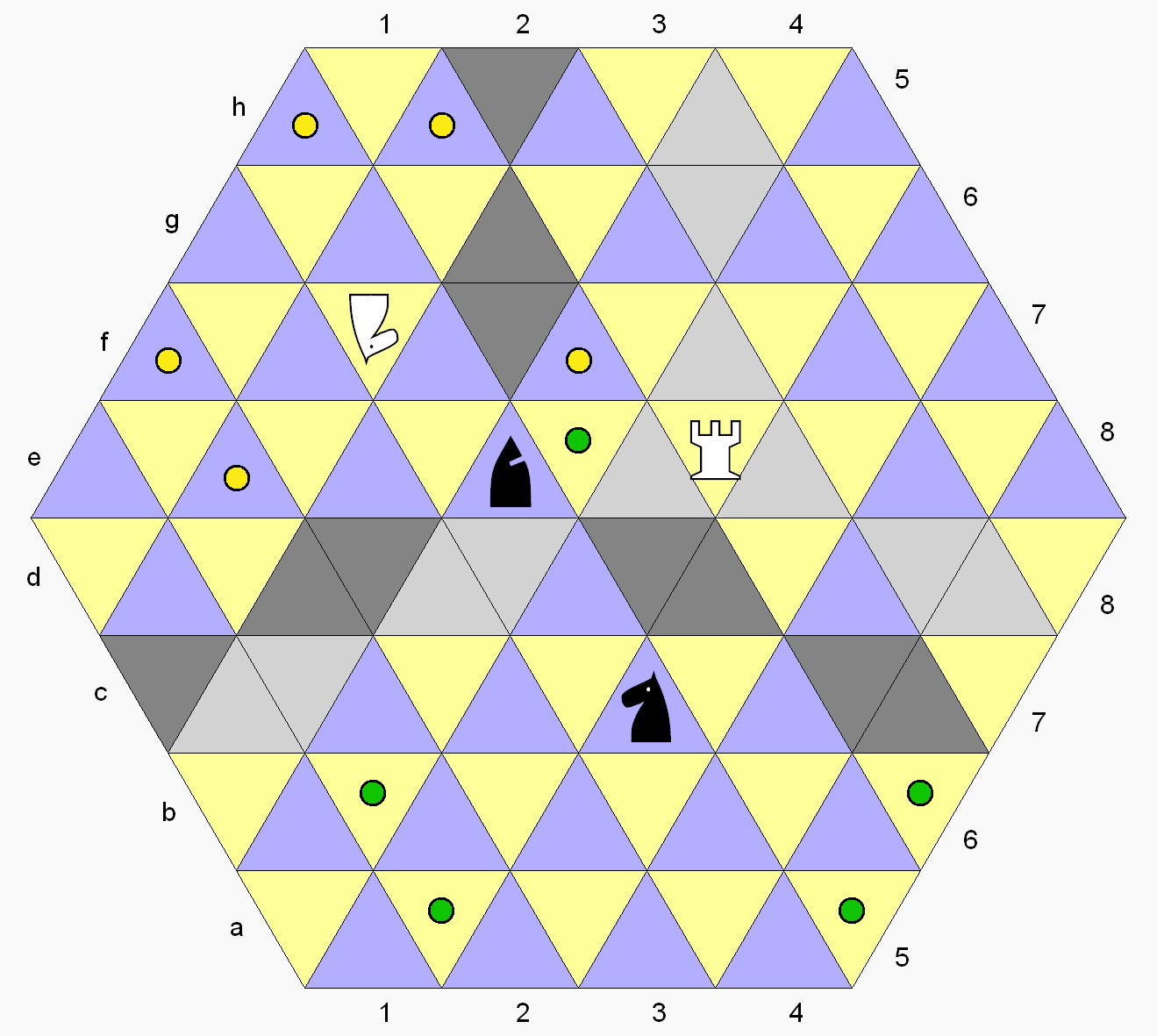
The rook moves along cells in the diagram colored light gray; the bishop along cells colored dark gray; the black knight can move to green dots, or capture the rook; the white unicorn can move to yellow dots, or capture the bishop.

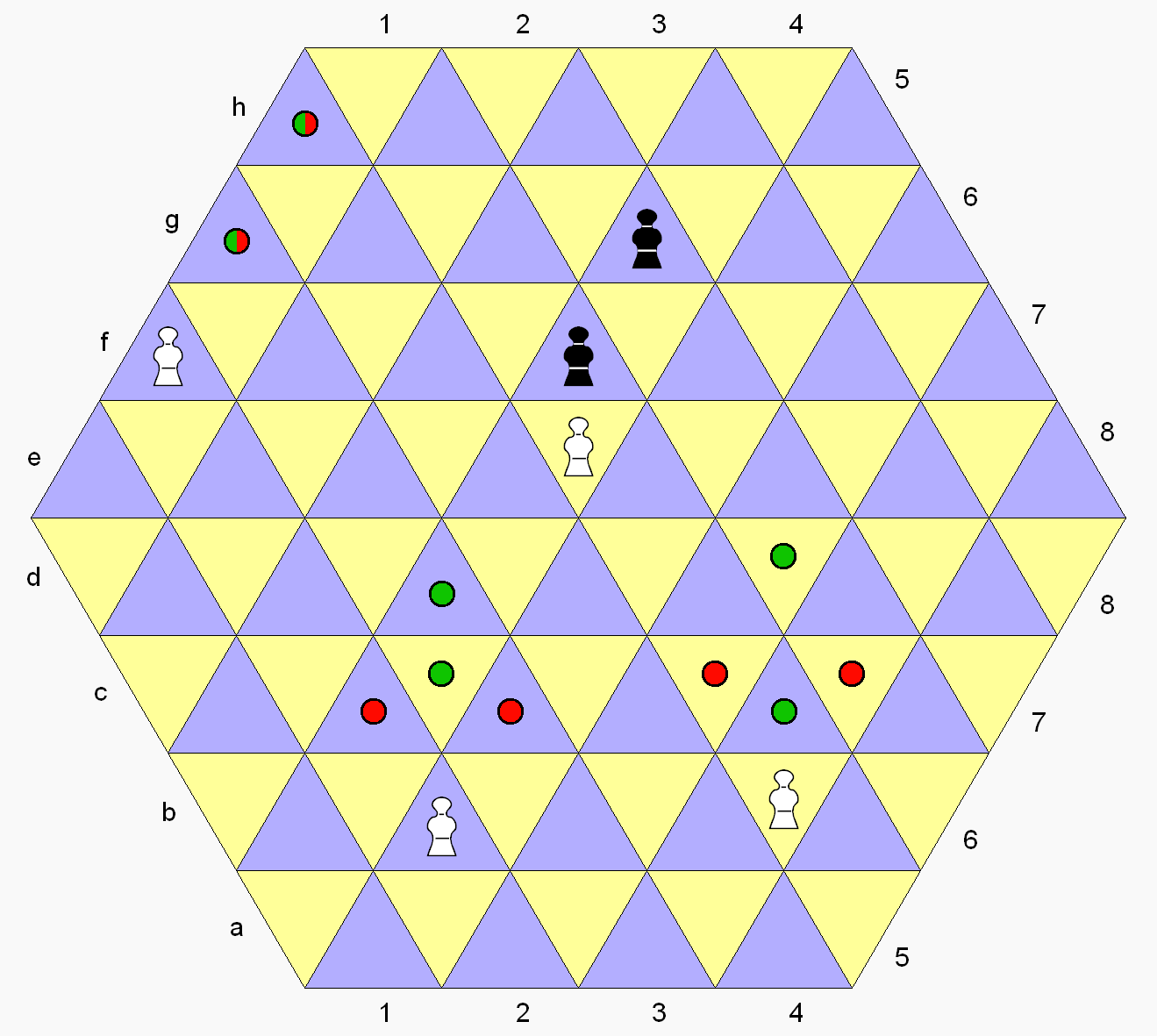
The white pawns can move to cells marked with green dots, or capture on red dots. The white pawn on f21 (Note: The notation system used identifies each cell by its horizontal rank (letter) and the intersection of two oblique files (two numbers).) has no step straight forward, so advances one step at a time to promotion using its capture move, either moving or capturing. If the black pawn on g46 advances, the white pawn on e54 can capture it, for example: 1... e55 2. exf64 e.p.

== Tri-chess ==
Tri-chess is a variation of triangular chess created by Dekle in the same year. The game is for two players and is the same as triangular chess in all respects except the moves of the bishop, rook, queen, and king are increased.

- A bishop moves in six directions constituting board diagonals.
- A rook moves in six directions along horizontal ranks or oblique files.
- The queen moves as a rook or bishop. (Twelve directions.)
- The king moves one step as a bishop or two steps as a rook.

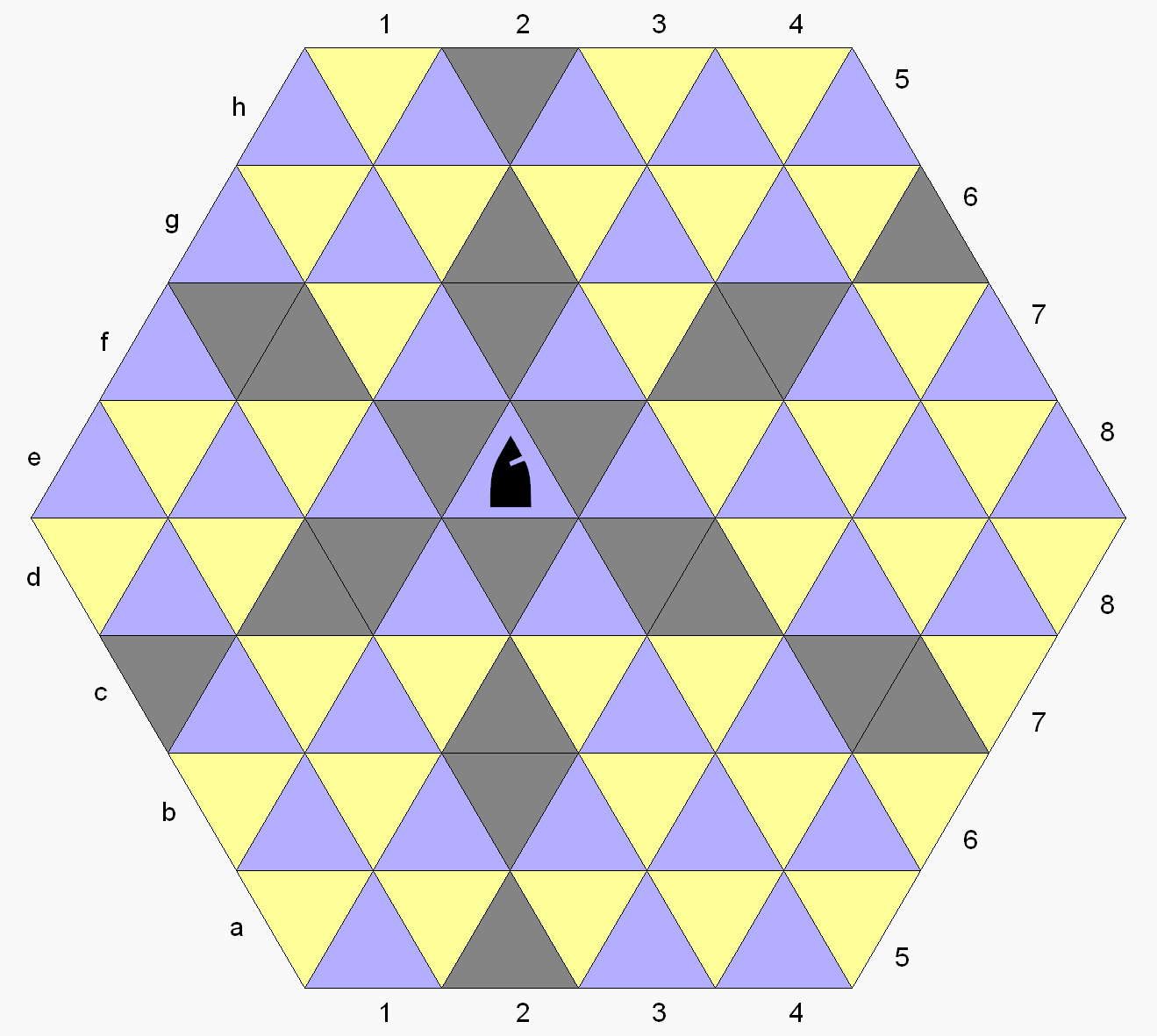
The bishop moves along cells in the diagram colored dark gray.

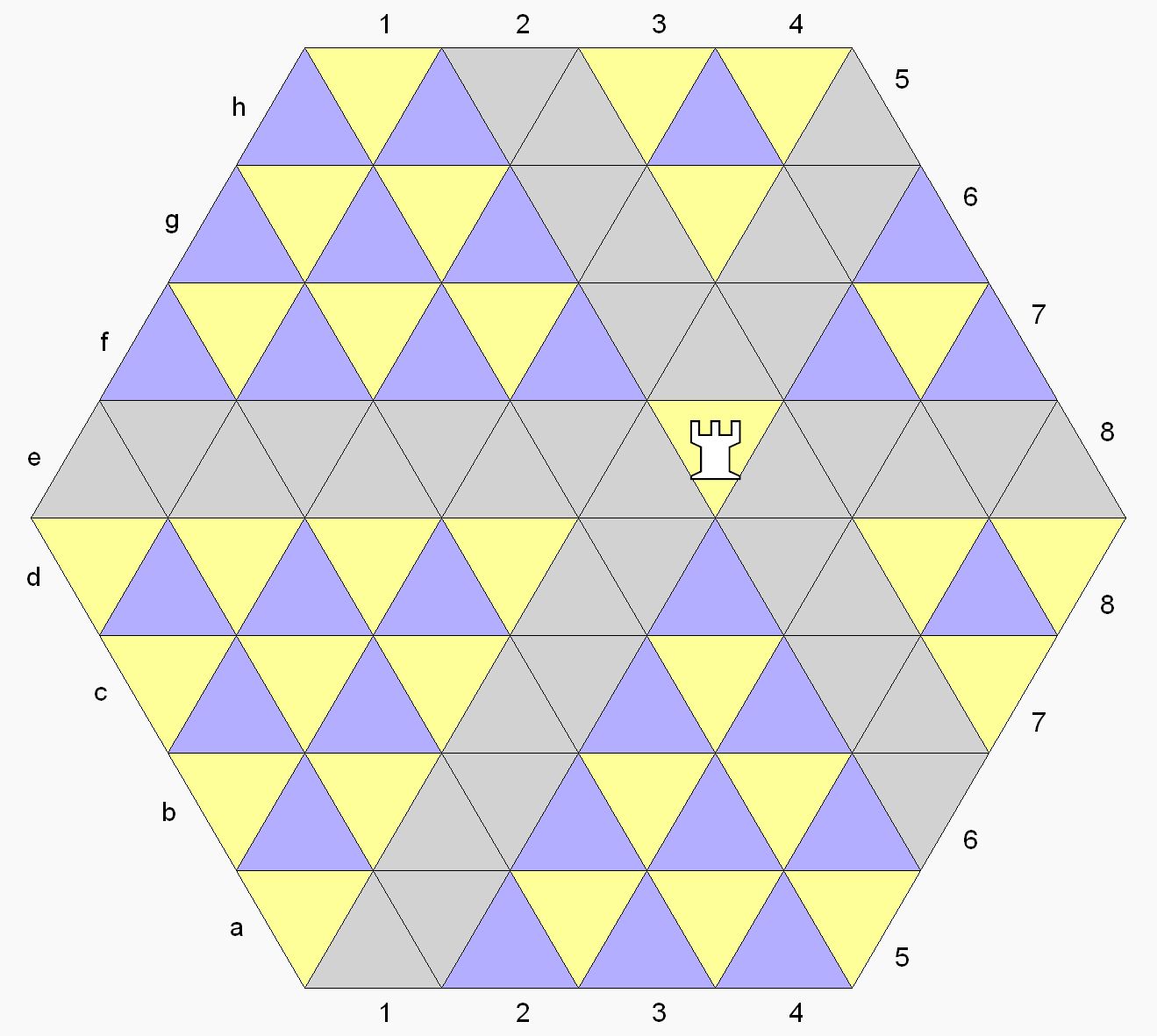
The rook moves along cells in the diagram colored light gray.

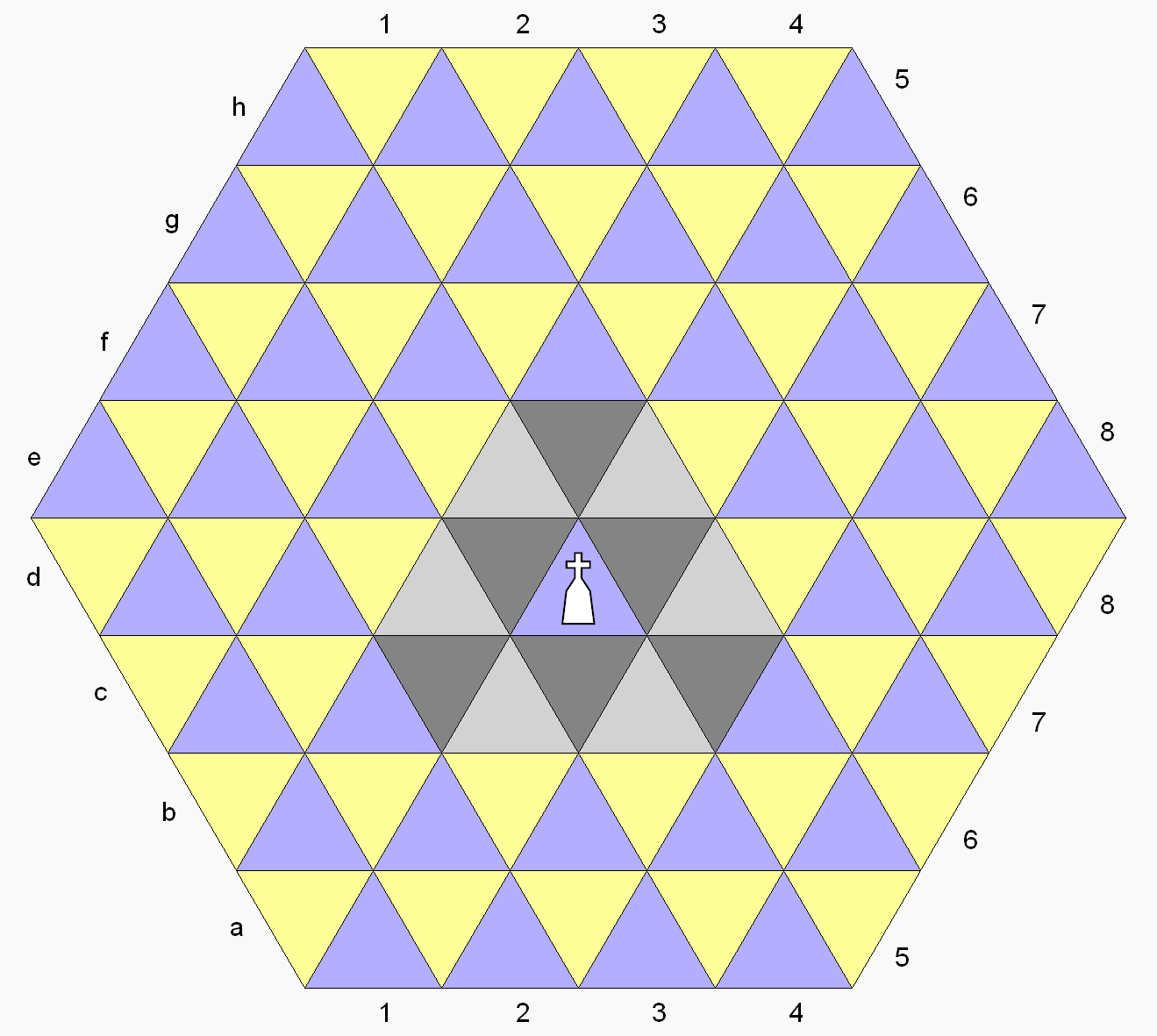
The Tri-Chess king moves one step as a bishop (dark gray cells) or two steps as a rook (light gray cells).

== See also ==
- Also by George Dekle:
  - Masonic chess
  - Tri-chess – a three-player variant with triangular cells
  - Trishogi – a shogi variant with triangular cells
