= Broscăuți =

- Commune
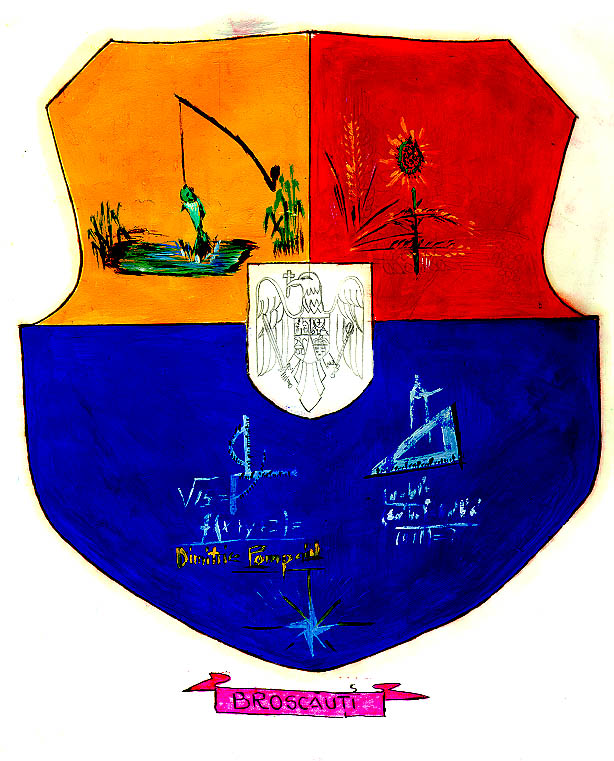
- Coat of arms

- Location in Botoșani County

- Location in Romania
- Coordinates: 47°57′N 26°27′E
- Country: Romania
- County: Botoșani
- Subdivisions: Broscăuți, Slobozia

Government
  - Mayor (2024–2028): Dorina Tiron (PNL)
- Area: 39.53 km^{2} (15.26 sq mi)
- Population (2021-12-01): 2,915
  - Density: 74/km^{2} (190/sq mi)
- Time zone: EET/EEST (UTC+2/+3)
- Postal code: 717040
- Area code: +40 x31
- Vehicle reg.: BT
- Website: www.primaria-broscauti.ro

Broscăuți is a commune in Botoșani County, Western Moldavia, Romania. It is composed of two villages, Broscăuți and Slobozia.

The commune had 3450 people at the 2002 census; of these, 99.9% were ethnic Romanians and 99.4% were Romanian Orthodox. The main occupation of its inhabitants is agriculture—growing plants like corn and potatoes, raising animals (cows, sheep, rabbits) and birds (ducks, chicken). Some of the people of Broscăuți work in the factories in nearby Dorohoi, which provides them with some extra money. A significant part of the commune's youth has emigrated to countries such as Italy and Spain since the 1990s.

== Notable natives ==
- Dimitrie Pompeiu (1873–1954), mathematician
