= Pompeiu derivative =

Concept in mathematical analysis

A graph of a function (top) whose derivative is a Pompeiu derivative (bottom).

In real analysis, a Pompeiu derivative is a real-valued function of one real variable that is the derivative of an everywhere differentiable function and that vanishes in a dense set. In particular, a Pompeiu derivative is discontinuous at every point where it is not 0. Whether non-identically zero such functions may exist was a problem that arose in the context of early-1900s research on functional differentiability and integrability. The question was affirmatively answered by Dimitrie Pompeiu by constructing an explicit example; these functions are therefore named after him.

== Pompeiu's construction ==
Pompeiu's construction is described here. Let $\sqrt[3]{x}$ denote the real cube root of the real number x. Let $\{q_j\}_{j \isin \mathbb{N}}$ be an enumeration of the rational numbers in the unit interval [0, 1]. Let $\{a_j\}_{j \isin \N}$ be positive real numbers with $\sum_j a_j < \infty.$ Define $g\colon [0, 1] \rarr \R$ by

$$g(x): = a_0+\sum_{j=1}^\infty \,a_j \sqrt[3]{x-q_j}.$$

For each x in [0, 1], each term of the series is less than or equal to a_{j} in absolute value, so the series uniformly converges to a continuous, strictly increasing function g(x), by the Weierstrass M-test. Moreover, it turns out that the function g is differentiable, with

$$g'(x) := \frac{1}{3} \sum_{j=1}^\infty \frac{a_j}{\sqrt[3]{(x-q_j)^2}}>0,$$

at every point where the sum is finite; also, at all other points, in particular, at each of the q_{j}, one has g′(x) := +∞. Since the image of g is a closed bounded interval with left endpoint

$$g(0) = a_0-\sum_{j=1}^\infty \,a_j \sqrt[3]{q_j},$$

up to the choice of $a_0$, we can assume $g(0)=0$ and up to the choice of a multiplicative factor we can assume that g maps the interval [0, 1] onto itself. Since g is strictly increasing it is injective, and hence a homeomorphism; and by the theorem of differentiation of the inverse function, its inverse f := g^{−1} has a finite derivative at every point, which vanishes at least at the points $\{g(q_j)\}_{j \isin \mathbb{N}}.$ These form a dense subset of [0, 1] (actually, it vanishes in many other points; see below).

== Properties ==
- It is known that the zero-set of a derivative of any everywhere differentiable function (and more generally, of any Baire class one function) is a G_{δ} subset of the real line. By definition, for any Pompeiu function, this set is a dense G_{δ} set; therefore it is a residual set. In particular, it possesses uncountably many points.
- A linear combination af(x) + bg(x) of Pompeiu functions is a derivative, and vanishes on the set { f = 0} ∩ {g = 0}, which is a dense $G_{\delta}$ set by the Baire category theorem. Thus, Pompeiu functions form a vector space of functions.
- A limit function of a uniformly convergent sequence of Pompeiu derivatives is a Pompeiu derivative. Indeed, it is a derivative, due to the theorem of limit under the sign of derivative. Moreover, it vanishes in the intersection of the zero sets of the functions of the sequence: since these are dense G_{δ} sets, the zero set of the limit function is also dense.
- As a consequence, the class E of all bounded Pompeiu derivatives on an interval [a, b] is a closed linear subspace of the Banach space of all bounded functions under the uniform distance (hence, it is a Banach space).
- Pompeiu's above construction of a positive function is a rather peculiar example of a Pompeiu's function: a theorem of Weil states that generically a Pompeiu derivative assumes both positive and negative values in dense sets, in the precise meaning that such functions constitute a residual set of the Banach space E.
