= Dimitrie Pompeiu =

Romanian mathematician (1873–1954)

- Born: 22 October 1873; Broscăuți, Romania
- Died: 8 October 1954 (aged 81); Bucharest, Romanian People's Republic
- Education: University of Paris
- Known for: Cauchy–Pompeiu formula Pompeiu problem Pompeiu–Hausdorff metric Pompeiu's theorem

39th President of the Assembly of Deputies
- In office 20 June 1931 – 10 June 1932
- Monarch: Carol II
- Preceded by: Ștefan Cicio Pop
- Succeeded by: Ștefan Cicio Pop
- Scientific career
- Fields: Mathematician
- Workplaces: University of Iași; University of Bucharest
- Thesis: Sur la continuité des fonctions de variables complexes (1905)
- Doctoral advisor: Henri Poincaré
- Doctoral students: Grigore Moisil

Dimitrie Pompeiu (Romanian: [diˈmitri.e pomˈpeju]; 4 October [O.S. 22 September] 1873 – 8 October 1954) was a Romanian mathematician, professor at the University of Bucharest, titular member of the Romanian Academy, and President of the Chamber of Deputies.

== Biography ==
He was born in 1873 in Broscăuți, Botoșani County, in a family of well-to-do peasants. After completing high school in nearby Dorohoi, he went to study at the Normal Teachers School in Bucharest, where he had Alexandru Odobescu as a teacher. After obtaining his diploma in 1893, he taught for five years at schools in Galați and Ploiești. In 1898 he went to France, where he studied mathematics at the University of Paris (the Sorbonne). He obtained his Ph.D. degree in mathematics in 1905, with thesis On the continuity of complex variable functions written under the direction of Henri Poincaré.

After returning to Romania, Pompeiu was named Professor of Mechanics at the University of Iași. In 1912, he assumed a chair at the University of Bucharest. In the early 1930s he was elected to the Chamber of Deputies as a member of Nicolae Iorga's Democratic Nationalist Party, and served as President of the Chamber of Deputies for a year. In 1934, Pompeiu was elected titular member of the Romanian Academy, while in 1943 he was elected to the Romanian Academy of Sciences. In 1945, he became the founding director of the Institute of Mathematics of the Romanian Academy.

He died in Bucharest in 1954. A boulevard in the Pipera neighborhood of the city is named after him, and so is a school in his hometown of Broscăuți.

== Research ==
Pompeiu's contributions were mainly in the field of mathematical analysis, complex functions theory, and rational mechanics. In an article published in 1929, he posed a challenging conjecture in integral geometry, now widely known as the Pompeiu problem. Among his contributions to real analysis there is the construction, dated 1906, of non-constant, everywhere differentiable functions, with derivative vanishing on a dense set. Such derivatives are now called Pompeiu derivatives.

== Selected works ==
- Pompeiu, Dimitrie (1905), "Sur la continuité des fonctions de variables complexes", Annales de la Faculté des Sciences de Toulouse, Série 2 (in French), 7 (3): 265–315, JFM 36.0454.04
- Pompeiu, Dimitrie (1912), "Sur une classe de fonctions d'une variable complexe", Rendiconti del Circolo Matematico di Palermo (in French), 33 (1): 108–113, doi:10.1007/BF03015292, JFM 43.0481.01, S2CID 120717465
- Pompeiu, Dimitrie (1913), "Sur une classe de fonctions d'une variable complexe et sur certaines équations intégrales", Rendiconti del Circolo Matematico di Palermo (in French), 35 (1): 277–281, doi:10.1007/BF03015607, S2CID 121616964

== See also ==
- Cauchy–Pompeiu formula
- Pompeiu–Hausdorff metric
- Pompeiu's theorem
- Pompeiu derivative
- Wirtinger derivatives

== Sources ==
- Bîrsan, Temistocle; Tiba, Dan (2006), "One hundred years since the introduction of the set distance by Dimitrie Pompeiu", in Ceragioli, Francesca; Dontchev, Asen; Futura, Hitoshi; Marti, Kurt; Pandolfi, Luciano (eds.), System Modeling and Optimization, vol. 199, Boston: Kluwer Academic Publishers, pp. 35–39, doi:10.1007/0-387-33006-2_4, ISBN 978-0-387-32774-7, MR 2249320
- Mocanu, Petru. "Dimitrie Pompeiu (1873-1954)" (in Romanian). Babeș-Bolyai University.
