= Polyiamond =

Polyform whose base form is an equilateral triangle

A polyiamond (also polyamond or simply iamond, or sometimes triangular polyomino) is a polyform whose base form is an equilateral triangle. The word polyiamond is a back-formation from diamond, because this word is often used to describe the shape of a pair of equilateral triangles placed base to base, and the initial 'di-' looks like a Greek prefix meaning 'two-' (though diamond actually derives from Greek ἀδάμας – also the basis for the word "adamant"). The name was suggested by recreational mathematics writer Thomas H. O'Beirne in New Scientist 1961 number 1, page 164.

== Counting ==
The basic combinatorial question is, how many different polyiamonds exist with a given number of cells? Like polyominoes, polyiamonds may be either free or one-sided. Free polyiamonds are invariant under reflection as well as translation and rotation. One-sided polyiamonds distinguish reflections.

The number of free n-iamonds for n = 1, 2, 3, ... is:

1, 1, 1, 3, 4, 12, 24, 66, 160, ... (sequence A000577 in the OEIS).

The number of free polyiamonds with holes is given by OEIS: A070764; the number of free polyiamonds without holes is given by OEIS: A070765; the number of fixed polyiamonds is given by OEIS: A001420; the number of one-sided polyiamonds is given by OEIS: A006534.

Name	Number of forms	Forms
Moniamond	1	
Diamond	1	
Triamond	1	
Tetriamond	3	
Pentiamond	4	
Hexiamond	12	

Some authors also call the diamond (rhombus with a 60° angle) a calisson after the French sweet of similar shape.

== Symmetries ==
Possible symmetries are mirror symmetry, 2-, 3-, and 6-fold rotational symmetry, and each combined with mirror symmetry.

2-fold rotational symmetry with and without mirror symmetry requires at least 2 and 4 triangles, respectively. 6-fold rotational symmetry with and without mirror symmetry requires at least 6 and 18 triangles, respectively. Asymmetry requires at least 5 triangles. 3-fold rotational symmetry without mirror symmetry requires at least 7 triangles.

In the case of only mirror symmetry we can distinguish having the symmetry axis aligned with the grid or rotated 30° (requires at least 4 and 3 triangles, respectively); ditto for 3-fold rotational symmetry, combined with mirror symmetry (requires at least 18 and 1 triangles, respectively).

== Generalizations ==
Like polyominoes, but unlike polyhexes, polyiamonds have three-dimensional counterparts, formed by aggregating tetrahedra. However, polytetrahedra do not tile 3-space in the way polyiamonds can tile 2-space.

== Tessellations ==
Every polyiamond of order 8 or less tiles the plane, except for the V-heptiamond.

== Correspondence with polyhexes ==
Pentiamond with corresponding pentahex superimposed.

Every polyiamond corresponds to a polyhex, as illustrated at right. Conversely, every polyhex is also a polyiamond, because each hexagonal cell of a polyhex is the union of six adjacent equilateral triangles. Neither correspondence is one-to-one.

== In popular culture ==
The set of 22 polyiamonds, from order 1 up to order 6, constitutes the shape of the playing pieces in the board game Blokus Trigon, where players attempt to tile a plane with as many polyiamonds as possible, subject to the game rules.

== See also ==
- Triangular tiling
- Rhombille tiling
- Sphinx tiling
