= Polyform =

2D shape constructed by joining together identical basic polygons

The 18 one-sided pentominoes: polyforms consisting of five squares.

In recreational mathematics, a polyform is a plane figure or solid compound constructed by joining together identical basic polygons. The basic polygon is often (but not necessarily) a convex plane-filling polygon, such as a square or a triangle. More specific names have been given to polyforms resulting from specific basic polygons, as detailed in the table below. For example, a square basic polygon results in the well-known polyominoes.

== Construction rules ==
The rules for joining the polygons together may vary, and must therefore be stated for each distinct type of polyform. Generally, however, the following rules apply:

1. Two basic polygons may be joined only along a common edge, and must share the entirety of that edge.
2. No two basic polygons may overlap.
3. A polyform must be connected (that is, all one piece; see connected graph, connected space). Configurations of disconnected basic polygons do not qualify as polyforms.
4. The mirror image of an asymmetric polyform is not considered a distinct polyform (polyforms are "double sided").

These construction rules are not meant to be set in stone, but rather serve as general guidelines as to how polyforms may be constructed. Modifications of the first construction rule, for example, lead to different polyforms. Joining at a common vertex may lead to polykings, and being joined not by edge, but by the chess movement of the knight may lead to polyknights.

== Generalizations ==
Polyforms can also be considered in higher dimensions. In 3-dimensional space, basic polyhedra can be joined along congruent faces. Joining cubes in this way produces the polycubes, and joining tetrahedrons in this way produces the polytetrahedrons. 2-dimensional polyforms can also be folded out of the plane along their edges, in similar fashion to a net; in the case of polyominoes, this results in polyominoids.

One can allow more than one basic polygon. The possibilities are so numerous that the exercise seems pointless, unless extra requirements are brought in. For example, the Penrose tiles define extra rules for joining edges, resulting in interesting polyforms with a kind of pentagonal symmetry.

When the base form is a polygon that tiles the plane, rule 1 may be broken. For instance, squares may be joined orthogonally at vertices, as well as at edges, to form hinged/pseudo-polyominoes, also known as polyplets or polykings.

== Types and applications ==
Polyforms are a rich source of problems, puzzles and games. The basic combinatorial problem is counting the number of different polyforms, given the basic polygon and the construction rules, as a function of n, the number of basic polygons in the polyform.

Regular polyforms
Sides	Basic polygon (monoform)	Monohedral tessellation	Polyform	Applications
3	equilateral triangle	Deltille	Polyiamonds: moniamond, diamond, triamond, tetriamond, pentiamond, hexiamond	Blokus Trigon
4	square	Quadrille	Polyominoes: monomino, domino, tromino, tetromino, pentomino, hexomino, heptomino, octomino, nonomino, decomino	Tetris, Fillomino, Tentai Show, Ripple Effect (puzzle), LITS, Nurikabe, Sudoku, Blokus
6	regular hexagon	Hextille	Polyhexes: monohex, dihex, trihex, tetrahex, pentahex, hexahex	Tantrix

Other low-dimensional polyforms
Sides	Basic polygon (monoform)	Monohedral tessellation	Polyform	Applications
1	line segment (square)	-	Polysticks: monostick, distick, tristick, tetrastick, pentastick, hexastick	Segment Displays
1	line segment (triangular)	-	Polytrigs	Segment Displays
1	line segment (hexagonal)	-	Polytwigs: monotwig, ditwig, tritwig, tetratwig, pentatwig, hexatwig	Segment Displays
3	30°-60°-90° triangle	Kisrhombille	Polydrafters: monodrafter, didrafter, tridrafter, tetradrafter, pentadrafter, hexadrafter	Eternity puzzle
3	right isosceles (45°-45°-90°) triangle	Kisquadrille	Polyaboloes: monabolo, diabolo, triabolo, tetrabolo, pentabolo, hexabolo, heptabolo, octabolo, enneabolo, decabolo	Tangram
3	30°-30°-120° isosceles triangle	Kisdeltille	Polypons: tripon, tetrapon	
3	golden triangle		Polyores	
4	square (connected at edges or corners)	Quadrille	Polykings: pentaking, hexaking, heptaking	
4	square (connected at edges, shifted by half)	Quadrille	Polyhops: dihop, trihop, tetrahop	
4	square (connected at edges in 3D space)	Quadrille	Polyominoids: monominoid	
4	square (representing path of a chess knight)	Quadrille	Polyknights: tetraknight, pentaknight, hexaknight	Knight in chess
4	rectangle	Stacked bond	Polyrects: tetrarect, pentarect, hexarect, heptarect	Brickwork
4	trapezoid		Polytraps: tritrap	
4	rhombus	Rhombille	Polyrhombs	
4	60°-90°-90°-120° kite	Tetrille	Polykites: trikite, tetrakite, pentakite, hexakite, heptakite	
4	half-squares		Polyares: triare, tetrare, pentare, hexare	
4	half-hexagons		Polyhes: monohe, dihe, trihe, tetrahe	
5	regular pentagon	-	Polypents: monopent, dipent, tripent, tetrapent, pentapent, hexapent, heptapent	
5	Cairo pentagon	4-fold pentille	Polycairoes	
5	flaptile	Iso(4-)pentille	Polyflaptiles: diflaptile, triflaptile, tetraflaptile	
5	120°-120°-120°-120°-60° pentagon	6-fold pentille	Polyflorets	
6	Rombik		Polyrombiks	
8	regular octagon (with squares)		Polyocts: dioct	
-	quarter of circular arc		Polybends	
-	circle (with concave circles as bridges)		Polyrounds	
-	quarter of circle, and quarter-circle sector removed from a square		Polyarcs: monarc, diarc, triarc	

High-dimensional polyforms
Edges	Basic polytope (monoform)	Monohedral honeycomb	Polyform	Applications
12	cube	Cubille	Polycubes: monocube, dicube, tricube, tetracube, pentacube, hexacube, heptacube, octacube	Soma cube, Bedlam cube, Diabolical cube, Snake cube, Slothouber–Graatsma puzzle, Conway puzzle, Herzberger Quader
12	half-cubes		Polybes: monobe, dibe, tribe, hexabe	
32	tesseract	Tesseractic honeycomb	Polytesseracts	

== See also ==
- Polycube
- Polyomino
- Polyominoid
