= Mathematical puzzle =

Type of puzzle

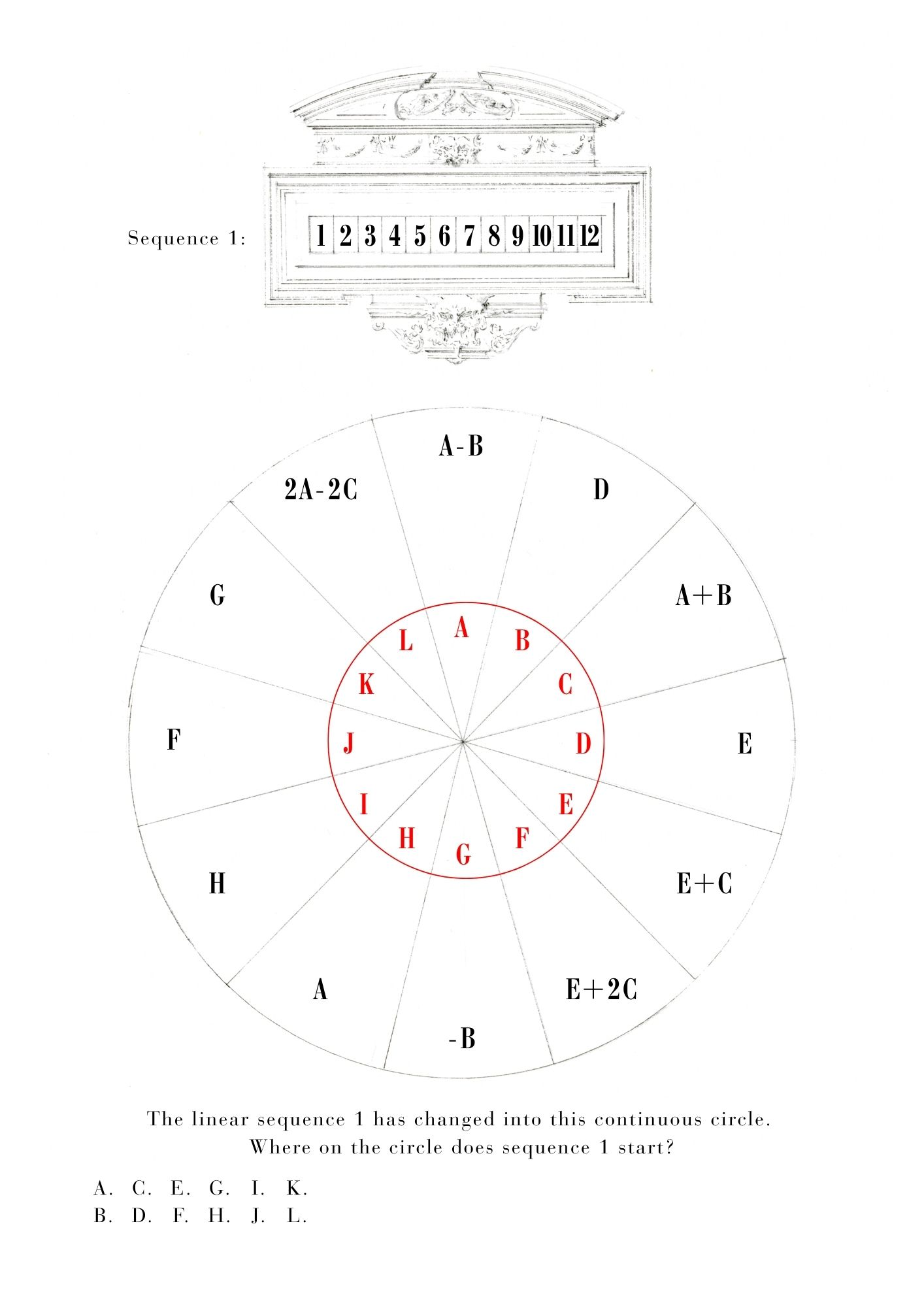
An example of a mathematical puzzle that challenges players to deduce the start of a linear sequence that has changed into a continuous circle. The terms of the sequence have been expressed Algebraically.

Mathematical puzzles make up an integral part of recreational mathematics. They have specific rules, but they do not usually involve competition between two or more players. Instead, to solve such a puzzle, the solver must find a solution that satisfies the given conditions. Mathematical puzzles require mathematics to solve them. Logic puzzles are a common type of mathematical puzzle.

Conway's Game of Life and fractals, as two examples, may also be considered mathematical puzzles even though the solver interacts with them only at the beginning by providing a set of initial conditions. After these conditions are set, the rules of the puzzle determine all subsequent changes and moves. Many of the puzzles are well known because they were discussed by Martin Gardner in his "Mathematical Games" column in Scientific American. Mathematical puzzles are sometimes used to motivate students in teaching elementary school math problem solving techniques. Creative thinking – or "thinking outside the box" – often helps to find the solution.

== List of mathematical puzzles ==
=== Numbers, arithmetic, and algebra ===
- Cross-figures or cross number puzzles
- Dyson numbers
- Four fours
- KenKen
- Water pouring puzzle
- The monkey and the coconuts
- Pirate loot problem
- Verbal arithmetics
- 24 Game
- Number Sequences - puzzles where you guess the missing number

=== Combinatorial ===
- Cryptograms
- Fifteen Puzzle
- Kakuro
- Rubik's Cube and other sequential movement puzzles
- Str8ts a number puzzle based on sequences
- Sudoku
- Sujiko
- Think-a-Dot
- Tower of Hanoi
- Bridges Game

=== Analytical or differential ===
- Ant on a rubber rope
- See also: Zeno's paradoxes

=== Probability ===
- Monty Hall problem

=== Tiling, packing, and dissection ===
- Bedlam cube
- Conway puzzle
- Mutilated chessboard problem
- Packing problem
- Pentominoes tiling
- Slothouber–Graatsma puzzle
- Soma cube
- T puzzle
- Tangram

=== Involves a board ===
- Conway's Game of Life
- Mutilated chessboard problem
- Peg solitaire
- Sudoku
- Nine dots problem

==== Chessboard tasks ====
- Eight queens puzzle
- Knight's Tour
- No-three-in-line problem

=== Topology, knots, graph theory ===
The fields of knot theory and topology, especially their non-intuitive conclusions, are often seen as a part of recreational mathematics.

- Disentanglement puzzles
- Seven Bridges of Königsberg
- Water, gas, and electricity
- Slitherlink

=== Mechanical ===
- Rubik's Cube
- Think-a-Dot
- Matchstick puzzle

=== 0-player puzzles ===
- Conway's Game of Life
- Flexagon
- Polyominoes
