= List of Martin Gardner Mathematical Games columns =

Over a period of 24 years (January 1957 – December 1980), Martin Gardner wrote 288 consecutive monthly "Mathematical Games" columns for Scientific American magazine. During the next 5.5 years, until June 1986, Gardner wrote 9 more columns, bringing his total to 297. During this period other authors wrote most of the columns. In 1981, Gardner's column alternated with a new column by Douglas Hofstadter called "Metamagical Themas" (an anagram of "Mathematical Games"). The table below lists Gardner's columns.

Twelve of Gardner's columns provided the cover art for that month's magazine, indicated by "[cover]" in the table with a hyperlink to the cover.

| date | Title |
|---|---|
| 1957 Jan | A new kind of magic square with remarkable properties |
| 1957 Feb | An assortment of maddening puzzles |
| 1957 Mar | Some old and new versions of ticktacktoe |
| 1957 Apr | Paradoxes dealing with birthdays, playing cards, coins, crows and red-haired typists |
| 1957 May | About the remarkable similarity between the Icosian Game and the Tower of Hanoi |
| 1957 Jun | Curious figures descended from the Möbius band, which has only one side and one edge |
| 1957 Jul | Concerning the game of Hex, which may be played on the tiles of the bathroom floor |
| 1957 Aug | The life and work of Sam Loyd, a mighty inventor of puzzles |
| 1957 Sep | Concerning various card tricks with a mathematical message |
| 1957 Oct | How to remember numbers by mnemonic devices such as cuff links and red zebras |
| 1957 Nov | Nine titillating puzzles |
| 1957 Dec | More about complex dominoes |
| 1958 Jan | A collection of tantalizing fallacies of mathematics |
| 1958 Feb | Concerning the game of Nim and its mathematical analysis |
| 1958 Mar | About left- and right-handedness, mirror images and kindred matters |
| 1958 Apr | Concerning the celebrated puzzle of five sailors, a monkey and a pile of coconuts |
| 1958 May | About tetraflexagons and tetraflexagation |
| 1958 Jun | About Henry Ernest Dudeney, a brilliant creator of puzzles |
| 1958 Jul | Some diverting tricks which involve the concept of numerical congruence |
| 1958 Aug | A third collection of "brain-teasers" |
| 1958 Sep | A game in which standard pieces composed of cubes are assembled into larger forms |
| 1958 Oct | Four mathematical diversions involving concepts of topology |
| 1958 Nov | How rectangles, including squares, can be divided into squares of unequal size [cover] |
| 1958 Dec | Diversions which involve the five Platonic solids |
| 1959 Jan | About mazes and how they can be traversed |
| 1959 Feb | "Brain-teasers" that involve formal logic |
| 1959 Mar | Concerning the properties of various magic squares |
| 1959 Apr | The mathematical diversions of a fictitious carnival man |
| 1959 May | Another collection of "brain-teasers" |
| 1959 Jun | An inductive card game |
| 1959 Jul | About Origami, the Japanese art of folding objects out of paper |
| 1959 Aug | About phi, an irrational number that has some remarkable geometrical expressions |
| 1959 Sep | Concerning mechanical puzzles, and how an enthusiast has collected 2,000 of them |
| 1959 Oct | Problems involving questions of probability and ambiguity |
| 1959 Nov | How three modern mathematicians disproved a celebrated conjecture of Leonhard Euler [cover] |
| 1959 Dec | Diversions that clarify group theory, particularly by the weaving of braids |
| 1960 Jan | A fanciful dialogue about the wonders of numerology |
| 1960 Feb | A fifth collection of "brain-teasers" |
| 1960 Mar | The games and puzzles of Lewis Carroll |
| 1960 Apr | About mathematical games that are played on boards |
| 1960 May | Reflections on the packing of spheres |
| 1960 Jun | Recreations involving folding and cutting sheets of paper |
| 1960 Jul | Incidental information about the extraordinary number pi |
| 1960 Aug | An imaginary dialogue on "mathemagic": tricks based on mathematical principles |
| 1960 Sep | The celebrated four-color map problem of topology |
| 1960 Oct | A new collection of "brain-teasers" |
| 1960 Nov | More about the shapes that can be made with complex dominoes |
| 1960 Dec | Some recreations involving the binary number system |
| 1961 Jan | In which the author chats again with Dr. Matrix, numerologist extraordinary |
| 1961 Feb | Diversions that involve one of the classic conic sections: the ellipse |
| 1961 Mar | How to play dominoes in two and three dimensions |
| 1961 Apr | Concerning the diversions in a new book on geometry [cover] |
| 1961 May | In which the editor of this department meets the legendary Bertrand Apollinax |
| 1961 Jun | A new collection of "brain teasers" |
| 1961 Jul | Some diverting mathematical board games |
| 1961 Aug | Some entertainments that involve the calculus of finite differences |
| 1961 Sep | Surfaces with edges linked in the same way as the three rings of a well-known design |
| 1961 Oct | Diversions that involve the mathematical constant "e" |
| 1961 Nov | Wherein geometrical figures are dissected to make other figures |
| 1961 Dec | On the theory of probability and the practice of gambling |
| 1962 Jan | An adventure in hyperspace at the Church of the Fourth Dimension |
| 1962 Feb | A clutch of diverting problems |
| 1962 Mar | How to build a game-learning machine and teach it to play and win |
| 1962 Apr | About three types of spirals and how to construct them |
| 1962 May | Symmetry and asymmetry and the strange world of upside-down art |
| 1962 Jun | The game of solitaire and some variations and transformations |
| 1962 Jul | Fiction about life in two dimensions |
| 1962 Aug | A variety of diverting tricks collected at a fictitious convention of magicians |
| 1962 Sep | Tests that show whether a large number can be divided by a number from 2 to 12 |
| 1962 Oct | A collection of puzzles involving numbers, logic, and probability |
| 1962 Nov | Some puzzles based on checkerboards |
| 1962 Dec | Some simple tricks and manipulations from the ancient lore of string play |
| 1963 Jan | The author pays his annual visit to Dr. Matrix, the numerologist |
| 1963 Feb | Curves of constant width, one of which makes it possible to drill square holes |
| 1963 Mar | A new paradox, and variations on it, about a man condemned to be hanged |
| 1963 Apr | A bit of foolishness for April Fools' Day |
| 1963 May | On rep-tiles, polygons that can make larger and smaller copies of themselves |
| 1963 Jun | A discussion of helical structures, from corkscrews to DNA molecules |
| 1963 Jul | Topological diversions, including a bottle with no inside or outside |
| 1963 Aug | Permutations and paradoxes in combinatorial mathematics |
| 1963 Sep | How to solve puzzles by graphing the rebounds of a bouncing ball |
| 1963 Oct | About two new and two old mathematical board games |
| 1963 Nov | A mixed bag of problems |
| 1963 Dec | How to use the odd-even check for tricks and problem-solving |
| 1964 Jan | Presenting the one and only Dr. Matrix, numerologist, in his annual performance |
| 1964 Feb | The hypnotic fascination of sliding-block puzzles |
| 1964 Mar | The remarkable lore of the prime numbers [cover] |
| 1964 Apr | Various problems based on planar graphs, or sets of "vertices" connected by "edges" |
| 1964 May | The tyranny of 10 overthrown with the ternary number system |
| 1964 Jun | A collection of short problems and more talk of prime numbers |
| 1964 Jul | Curious properties of a cycloid curve |
| 1964 Aug | Concerning several magic tricks based on mathematical principles |
| 1964 Sep | Puns, palindromes and other word games that partake of the mathematical spirit |
| 1964 Oct | Simple proofs of the Pythagorean theorem, and sundry other matters |
| 1964 Nov | Some paradoxes and puzzles involving infinite series and the concept of limit |
| 1964 Dec | On polyiamonds: shapes that are made out of equilateral triangles |
| 1965 Jan | Some comments by Dr. Matrix on symmetries and reversals |
| 1965 Feb | Tetrahedrons in nature and architecture, and puzzles involving this simplest polyhedron |
| 1965 Mar | A new group of short problems |
| 1965 Apr | The infinite regress in philosophy, literature and mathematical proof |
| 1965 May | The lattice of integers considered as an orchard or a billiard table |
| 1965 Jun | Some diversions and problems from Mr. O'Gara, the postman |
| 1965 Jul | On the relation between mathematics and the ordered patterns of Op art [cover] |
| 1965 Aug | Thoughts on the task of communication with intelligent organisms on other worlds |
| 1965 Sep | The superellipse: a curve that lies between the ellipse and the rectangle |
| 1965 Oct | Pentominoes and polyominoes: five games and a sampling of problems |
| 1965 Nov | A selection of elementary word and number problems |
| 1965 Dec | Magic stars, graphs and polyhedrons |
| 1966 Jan | Dr. Matrix returns, now in the guise of a neo-Freudian psychonumeranalyst |
| 1966 Feb | Recreational numismatics, or a purse of coin puzzles |
| 1966 Mar | The hierarchy of infinities and the problems it spawns |
| 1966 Apr | The eerie mathematical art of Maurits C. Escher |
| 1966 May | How to cook a puzzle, or mathematical one-uppery |
| 1966 Jun | The persistence (and futility) of efforts to trisect the angle |
| 1966 Jul | Freud's friend Wilhelm Fliess and his theory of male and female life cycles |
| 1966 Aug | Puzzles that can be solved by reasoning based on elementary physical principles |
| 1966 Sep | The problem of Mrs. Perkins' quilt |
| 1966 Oct | Can the shuffling of cards (and other apparently random events) be reversed? |
| 1966 Nov | Is it possible to visualize a four-dimensional figure? |
| 1966 Dec | The multiple charms of Pascal's triangle |
| 1967 Jan | Dr. Matrix delivers a talk on acrostics |
| 1967 Feb | Mathematical strategies for two-person contests |
| 1967 Mar | An array of problems that can be solved with elementary mathematical techniques |
| 1967 Apr | The amazing feats of professional mental calculators, and some tricks of the trade |
| 1967 May | Cube-root extraction and the calendar trick, or how to cheat in mathematics |
| 1967 Jun | The polyhex and the polyabolo, polygonal jigsaw puzzle pieces |
| 1967 Jul | Of sprouts and Brussels sprouts, games with a topological flavor |
| 1967 Aug | In which a computer prints out mammoth polygonal factorials |
| 1967 Sep | Double acrostics, stylized Victorian ancestors of today's crossword puzzle |
| 1967 Oct | Problems that are built on the knight's move in chess |
| 1967 Nov | A mixed bag of logical and illogical problems to solve |
| 1967 Dec | Game theory is applied (for a change) to games |
| 1968 Jan | The beauties of the square, as expounded by Dr. Matrix to rehabilitate the hippie |
| 1968 Feb | Combinatorial problems involving tree graphs and forests of trees |
| 1968 Mar | A short treatise on the useless elegance of perfect numbers and amicable pairs |
| 1968 Apr | Puzzles and tricks with a dollar bill |
| 1968 May | Circles and spheres, and how they kiss and pack |
| 1968 Jun | Combinatorial possibilities in a pack of shuffled cards |
| 1968 Jul | On the meaning of randomness and some ways of achieving it |
| 1968 Aug | An array of puzzles and tricks, with a few traps for the unwary |
| 1968 Sep | Counting systems and the relationship between numbers and the real world |
| 1968 Oct | MacMahon's color triangles and the joys of fitting them together |
| 1968 Nov | On the ancient lore of dice and the odds against making a point |
| 1968 Dec | The world of the Möbius strip: endless, edgeless and one-sided |
| 1969 Jan | Dr. Matrix gives his explanation of why Mr. Nixon was elected President |
| 1969 Feb | Boolean algebra, Venn diagrams and the propositional calculus |
| 1969 Mar | The multiple fascinations of the Fibonacci sequence |
| 1969 Apr | An octet of problems that emphasize gamesmanship, logic and probability |
| 1969 May | The rambling random walk and its gambling equivalent |
| 1969 Jun | Random walks, by semidrunk bugs and others, on the square and on the cube |
| 1969 Jul | Tricks, games and puzzles that employ matches as counters and line segments |
| 1969 Aug | Simplicity as a scientific concept: Does nature keep her accounts on a thumbnail? |
| 1969 Sep | Geometric constructions with a compass and a straightedge, and also with a compass alone |
| 1969 Oct | A numeranalysis by Dr. Matrix of the lunar flight of Apollo 11 |
| 1969 Nov | A new pencil-and-paper game based on inductive reasoning [cover] |
| 1969 Dec | A handful of combinatorial problems based on dominoes |
| 1970 Jan | The abacus: primitive but effective digital computer |
| 1970 Feb | Nine new puzzles to solve |
| 1970 Mar | Cyclic numbers and their properties |
| 1970 Apr | Some mathematical curiosities embedded in the Solar System |
| 1970 May | Of optical illusions, from figures that are undecidable to hot dogs that float |
| 1970 Jun | Elegant triangle theorems not to be found in Euclid |
| 1970 Jul | Diophantine analysis and the problem of Fermat's legendary last theorem |
| 1970 Aug | Backward run numbers, letters, words and sentences until boggles the mind |
| 1970 Sep | On the cyclical curves generated by wheels that roll along wheels |
| 1970 Oct | The fantastic combinations of John Conway's new solitaire game "life" |
| 1970 Nov | A new collection of short problems and the answers to some of "life's" |
| 1970 Dec | The paradox of the nontransitive dice and the elusive principle of indifference |
| 1971 Jan | Lessons from Dr. Matrix in chess and numerology |
| 1971 Feb | On cellular automata, self-reproduction, the Garden of Eden and the game "life" [cover] |
| 1971 Mar | The orders of infinity, the topological nature of dimension and "supertasks" |
| 1971 Apr | Geometric fallacies: hidden errors pave the road to absurd conclusions |
| 1971 May | The combinatorial richness of folding a piece of paper |
| 1971 Jun | The Turing game and the question it presents: Can a computer think? |
| 1971 Jul | Quickie problems: not hard, but look out for the curves |
| 1971 Aug | Ticktacktoe and its complications |
| 1971 Sep | The plaiting of Plato's polyhedrons and the asymmetrical yin-yang-lee |
| 1971 Oct | New puzzles from the game of Halma, the noble ancestor of Chinese checkers |
| 1971 Nov | Advertising premiums to beguile the mind: classics by Sam Loyd, master puzzle-poser |
| 1971 Dec | Further encounters with touching cubes, and the paradoxes of Zeno as "supertasks" |
| 1972 Jan | How to triumph at nim by playing safe, and John Horton Conway's game "Hackenbush" |
| 1972 Feb | Dr. Matrix poses some heteroliteral puzzles while peddling perpetual motion in Houston |
| 1972 Mar | The graceful graphs of Solomon Golomb, or how to number a graph parsimoniously |
| 1972 Apr | A topological problem with a fresh twist, and eight other new recreational puzzles |
| 1972 May | Challenging chess tasks for puzzle buffs and answers to the recreational problems |
| 1972 Jun | A miscellany of transcendental problems: simple to state but not at all easy to solve |
| 1972 Jul | Amazing mathematical card tricks that do not require prestidigitation |
| 1972 Aug | The curious properties of the Gray code and how it can be used to solve puzzles |
| 1972 Sep | Pleasurable problems with polycubes, and the winning strategy for Slither |
| 1972 Oct | Why the long arm of coincidence is usually not as long as it seems |
| 1972 Nov | On the practical uses and bizarre abuses of Sir Francis Bacon's biliteral cipher |
| 1972 Dec | Knotty problems with a two-hole torus |
| 1973 Jan | Sim, Chomp and Race Track: new games for the intellect (and not for Lady Luck) |
| 1973 Feb | Up-and-down elevator games and Piet Hein's mechanical puzzles |
| 1973 Mar | The calculating rods of John Napier, the eccentric father of the logarithm |
| 1973 Apr | How to turn a chessboard into a computer and to calculate with negabinary numbers |
| 1973 May | A new miscellany of problems, and encores for Race Track, Sim, Chomp and elevators |
| 1973 Jun | Plotting the crossing number of graphs |
| 1973 Jul | Free will revisited, with a mind-bending prediction paradox by William Newcomb |
| 1973 Aug | An astounding self-test of clairvoyance by Dr. Matrix |
| 1973 Sep | Problems on the surface of a sphere offer an entertaining introduction to point sets |
| 1973 Oct | "Look-see" diagrams that offer visual proof of complex algebraic formulas |
| 1973 Nov | Fantastic patterns traced by programmed "worms" |
| 1973 Dec | On expressing integers as the sum of cubes and other unsolved number-theory problems |
| 1974 Jan | The combinatorial basis of the "I Ching," the Chinese book of divination and wisdom [cover] |
| 1974 Feb | Cram, crosscram and quadraphage: new games having elusive winning strategies |
| 1974 Mar | Reflections on Newcomb's problem: a prediction and free-will dilemma |
| 1974 Apr | Nine challenging problems, some rational and some not |
| 1974 May | On the contradictions of time travel |
| 1974 Jun | Dr. Matrix brings his numerological Science to bear on the occult powers of the pyramid |
| 1974 Jul | On the patterns and the unusual properties of figurate numbers |
| 1974 Aug | On the fanciful history and the creative challenges of the puzzle game of tangrams |
| 1974 Sep | More on tangrams: Combinatorial problems and the game possibilities of snug tangrams |
| 1974 Oct | On the paradoxical situations that arise from nontransitive relations |
| 1974 Nov | Some new and dramatic demonstrations of number theorems with playing cards |
| 1974 Dec | The arts as combinatorial mathematics, or how to compose like Mozart with dice |
| 1975 Jan | The curious magic of anamorphic art [cover] |
| 1975 Feb | How the absence of anything leads to thoughts of nothing |
| 1975 Mar | From rubber ropes to rolling cubes, a miscellany of refreshing problems |
| 1975 Apr | Six sensational discoveries that somehow or another have escaped public attention |
| 1975 May | On the remarkable Császár polyhedron and its applications in problem solving |
| 1975 Jun | Games of strategy for two players: star nim, meander, dodgem and rex |
| 1975 Jul | On tessellating the plane with convex polygon tiles |
| 1975 Aug | More about tiling the plane: the possibilities of polyominoes, polyiamonds, and polyhexes |
| 1975 Sep | Dr. Matrix finds numerological wonders in the King James Bible |
| 1975 Oct | Concerning an effort to demonstrate extrasensory perception by machine |
| 1975 Nov | On map projections (with special reference to some inspired ones) [cover] |
| 1975 Dec | A random assortment of puzzles, together with reader responses to earlier problems |
| 1976 Jan | A breakthrough in magic squares, and the first perfect magic cube |
| 1976 Feb | Some elegant brick-packing problems, and a new order-7 perfect magic cube |
| 1976 Mar | On the fabric of inductive logic, and some probability paradoxes |
| 1976 Apr | Snarks, Boojums and other conjectures related to the four-color-map theorem |
| 1976 May | A few words about everything there was, is and ever will be |
| 1976 Jun | Catalan numbers: an integer sequence that materializes in unexpected places |
| 1976 Jul | Fun and serious business with the small electronic calculator |
| 1976 Aug | The symmetrical arrangement of the stars on the American flag and related matters |
| 1976 Sep | John Horton Conway's book covers an infinity of games |
| 1976 Oct | Combinatorial problems, some old, some new and all newly attacked by computer |
| 1976 Nov | In which DM (Dr. Matrix) is revealed as the guru of PM (Pentagonal Meditation) |
| 1976 Dec | In which "monster" curves force redefinition of the word "curve" |
| 1977 Jan | Extraordinary nonperiodic tiling that enriches the theory of tiles [cover] |
| 1977 Feb | The flip-strip sonnet, the lipogram and other mad modes of wordplay |
| 1977 Mar | Cornering a queen leads unexpectedly into corners of the theory of numbers |
| 1977 Apr | The pool-table triangle, a limerick paradox and divers other challenges |
| 1977 May | The "jump proof" and its similarity to the toppling of a row of dominoes |
| 1977 Jun | The concept of negative numbers and the difficulty of grasping it |
| 1977 Jul | Cutting things into equal parts leads into significant areas of mathematics |
| 1977 Aug | A new kind of cipher that would take millions of years to break |
| 1977 Sep | On conic sections, ruled surfaces and other manifestations of the hyperbola |
| 1977 Oct | On playing New Eleusis, the game that simulates the search for truth |
| 1977 Nov | In which joining sets of points by lines leads into diverse (and diverting) paths |
| 1977 Dec | Dr. Matrix goes to California to apply punk to rock study |
| 1978 Jan | The sculpture of Miguel Berrocal can be taken apart like an interlocking mechanical puzzle |
| 1978 Feb | On checker jumping, the Amazon game, weird dice, card tricks and other playful pastimes |
| 1978 Mar | Count Dracula, Alice, Portia and many others consider various twists of logic |
| 1978 Apr | White and brown music, fractal curves and one-over-f fluctuations [cover] |
| 1978 May | The Bells: versatile numbers that can count partitions of a set, primes and even rhymes |
| 1978 Jun | A mathematical zoo of astounding critters, imaginary and otherwise |
| 1978 Jul | On Charles Sanders Peirce: philosopher and gamesman |
| 1978 Aug | A Möbius band has a finite thickness, and so it is actually a twisted prism |
| 1978 Sep | Puzzling over a problem-solving matrix, cubes of many colors and three-dimensional dominoes |
| 1978 Oct | Puzzles and number-theory problems arising from the curious fractions of ancient Egypt |
| 1978 Nov | In which a mathematical aesthetic is applied to modern minimal art |
| 1978 Dec | Is it a superintelligent robot or does Dr. Matrix ride again? |
| 1979 Jan | The diverse pleasures of circles that are tangent to one another |
| 1979 Feb | About rectangling rectangles, parodying Poe and many another pleasing problem |
| 1979 Mar | On altering the past, delaying the future and other ways of tampering with time |
| 1979 Apr | In which players of Tic-tac-toe are taught to hunt bigger game |
| 1979 May | How to be a psychic, even if you are a horse or some other animal |
| 1979 Jun | Chess problems on a higher plane, including mirror images, rotations and the superqueen |
| 1979 Jul | Douglas R. Hofstadter's "Gödel, Escher, Bach" |
| 1979 Aug | The imaginableness of the imaginary numbers |
| 1979 Sep | In some patterns of numbers or words there may be less than meets the eye |
| 1979 Oct | Some packing problems that cannot be solved by sitting on the suitcase |
| 1979 Nov | The random number omega bids fair to hold the mysteries of the universe |
| 1979 Dec | A pride of problems, including one that is virtually impossible |
| 1980 Jan | Checkers, a game that can be more interesting than one might think |
| 1980 Feb | The coloring of unusual maps leads into uncharted territory |
| 1980 Mar | Graphs that can help cannibals, missionaries, wolves, goats and cabbages get there from here |
| 1980 Apr | Fun with eggs: uncooked, cooked and mathematic |
| 1980 May | What unifies dinner guests, strolling schoolgirls and handcuffed prisoners? |
| 1980 Jun | The capture of the monster: a mathematical group with a ridiculous number of elements |
| 1980 Jul | The pleasures of doing Science and technology in the planiverse |
| 1980 Aug | On the fine art of putting players, pills and points into their proper pigeonholes |
| 1980 Sep | Dr. Matrix, like Mr. Holmes, comes to an untimely and mysterious end |
| 1980 Oct | From counting votes to making votes count: the mathematics of elections |
| 1980 Nov | Taxicab geometry offers a free ride to a non-Euclidean locale |
| 1980 Dec | Patterns in primes are a clue to the strong law of small numbers |
| 1981 Feb | Gauss's congruence theory was mod as early as 1801 |
| 1981 Apr | How Lavinia finds a room on University Avenue, and other geometric problems |
| 1981 Jun | The inspired geometrical symmetries of Scott Kim |
| 1981 Aug | The abstract parabola fits the concrete world |
| 1981 Oct | Euclid's parallel postulate and its modern offspring |
| 1981 Dec | The Laffer curve and other laughs in current economics |
| 1983 Aug | Tasks you cannot help finishing no matter how hard you try to block finishing them |
| 1983 Sep | The topology of knots, plus the results of Douglas Hofstadter's Luring Lottery |
| 1986 Jun | Casting a net on a checkerboard and other puzzles of the forest |

== Other articles by Gardner ==
Gardner wrote 5 other articles for Scientific American. His flexagon article in December 1956 was in all but name the first article in the series of Mathematical Games columns and led directly to the series which began the following month. These five articles are listed below.

| date | Title |
|---|---|
| 1952 Mar | Logic Machines |
| 1956 Dec | Flexagons |
| 1967 Jan | Can Time go Backward? |
| 1998 Aug | A Quarter-Century of Recreational Mathematics |
| 2007 Apr | Is Beauty Truth and Truth Beauty? [book review] |
