= Polyominoid =

3D geometric figure formed from squares

The polyominoids for n = 1 through n = 3

In geometry, a polyominoid (or minoid for short) is a set of equal squares in 3D space, joined edge to edge at 90- or 180-degree angles. The polyominoids include the polyominoes, which are just the planar polyominoids. The surface of a cube is an example of a hexominoid, or 6-cell polyominoid, and many other polycubes have polyominoids as their boundaries. Polyominoids appear to have been first proposed by Richard A. Epstein.

== Classification ==
90-degree connections are called hard; 180-degree connections are called soft. This is because, in manufacturing a model of the polyominoid, a hard connection would be easier to realize than a soft one. Polyominoids may be classified as hard if every junction includes a 90° connection, soft if every connection is 180°, and mixed otherwise, except in the unique case of the monominoid, which has no connections of either kind. The set of soft polyominoids is equal to the set of polyominoes.

As with other polyforms, two polyominoids that are mirror images may be distinguished. One-sided polyominoids distinguish mirror images; free polyominoids do not.

== Enumeration ==
The table below enumerates free and one-sided polyominoids of up to 6 cells.

	Free				One-sided Total
Cells	Soft	Hard	Mixed	Total	One-sided Total
1	1	0	0	1	1
2	1	1	0	2	2
3	2	5	2	9	11
4	5	16	33	54	80
5	12	89	347	448	780
6	35	526	4089	4650	8781

Note that the number of hard polyominoids differs from size 5 onwards with the data in OEIS sequence A365654, as a result of a different definition of "hard".

== Generalization to higher dimensions ==
In general one can define an n,k-polyominoid as a polyform made by joining k-dimensional hypercubes at 90° or 180° angles in n-dimensional space, where 1≤k≤n.

- Polysticks are 2,1-polyominoids.
- Polyominoes are 2,2-polyominoids.
- The polyforms described above are 3,2-polyominoids.
- Polycubes are 3,3-polyominoids.
