= Polyknight =

Figure formed by knights moves on a grid

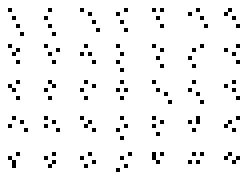
The 35 free tetraknights

A polyknight is a plane geometric figure formed by selecting cells in a square lattice that could represent the path of a chess knight in which doubling back is allowed. It is a polyform with square cells which are not necessarily connected, comparable to the polyking. Alternatively, it can be interpreted as a connected subset of the vertices of a knight's graph, a graph formed by connecting pairs of lattice squares that are a knight's move apart.

== Enumeration of polyknights ==
=== Free, one-sided, and fixed polyknights ===
Three common ways of distinguishing polyominoes for enumeration can also be extended to polyknights:

- free polyknights are distinct when none is a rigid transformation (translation, rotation, reflection or glide reflection) of another (pieces that can be picked up and flipped over).
- one-sided polyknights are distinct when none is a translation or rotation of another (pieces that cannot be flipped over).
- fixed polyknights are distinct when none is a translation of another (pieces that can be neither flipped nor rotated).

The following table shows the numbers of polyknights of various types with n cells.

n	free	one-sided	fixed
1	1	1	1
2	1	2	4
3	6	8	28
4	35	68	234
5	290	550	2,162
6	2,680	5,328	20,972
7	26,379	52,484	209,608
8	267,598	534,793	2,135,572
9	2,758,016	5,513,338	22,049,959
10	28,749,456	57,494,308	229,939,414
OEIS	A030446	A030445	A030444

Free polyknights
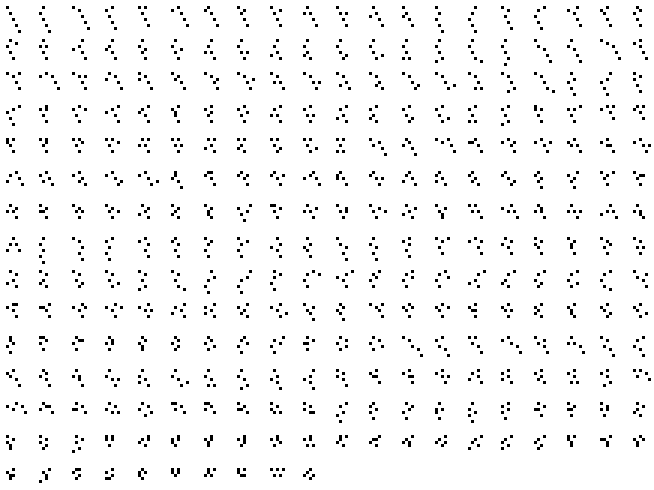
The 290 free pentaknights.

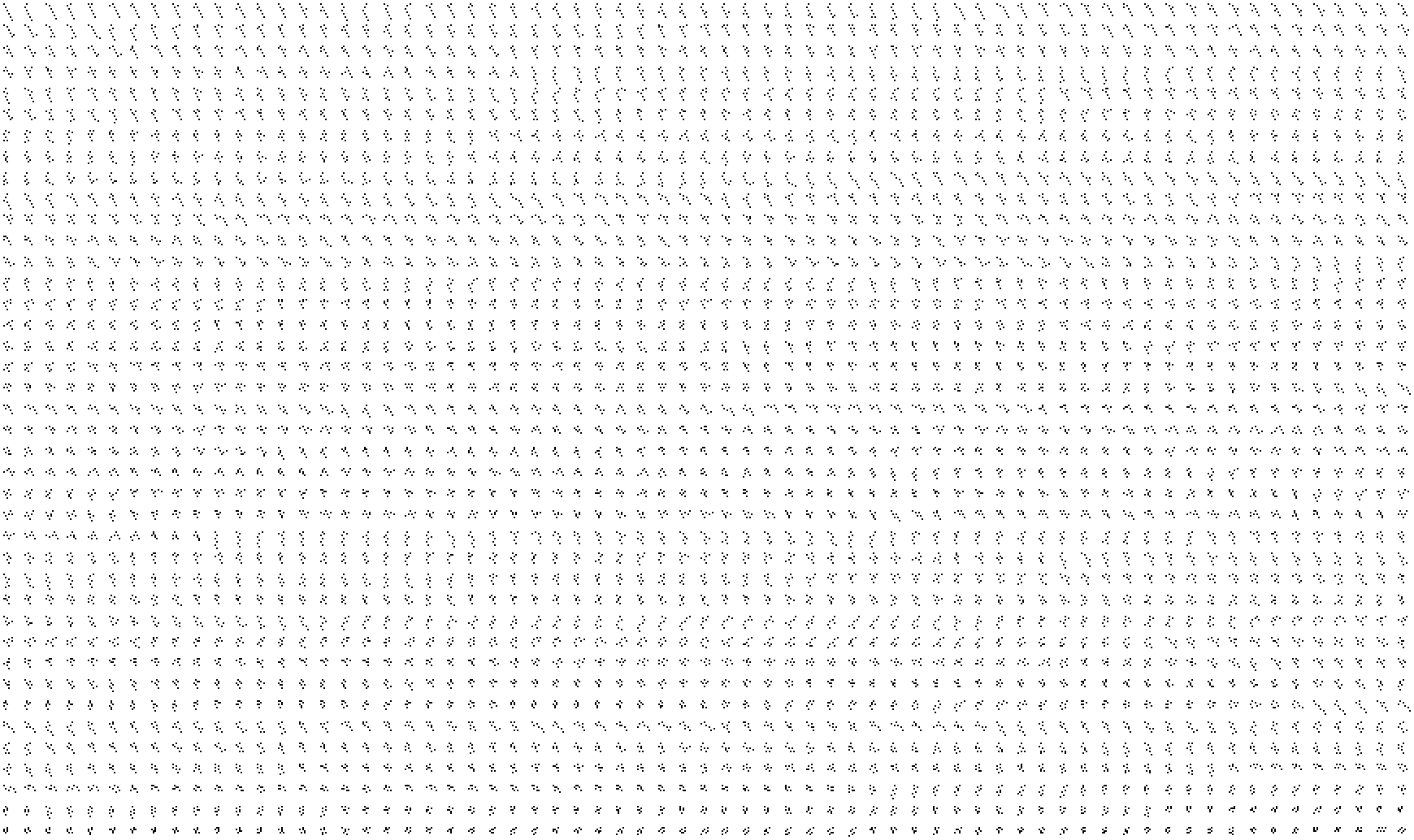
The 2,680 free hexaknights.
