= Polyabolo =

Shape formed from isosceles right triangles

In recreational mathematics, a polyabolo (also known as a polytan or polytrong) is a shape formed by gluing isosceles right triangles edge-to-edge, making a polyform with the isosceles right triangle as the base form. Polyaboloes were introduced by Martin Gardner in his June 1967 "Mathematical Games column" in Scientific American.

== Nomenclature ==
The name polyabolo is a back formation from the juggling object 'diabolo', although the shape formed by joining two triangles at just one vertex is not a proper polyabolo. By false analogy, treating the di- in diabolo as meaning "two", polyaboloes with from 1 to 10 cells are called respectively monaboloes, diaboloes, triaboloes, tetraboloes, pentaboloes, hexaboloes, heptaboloes, octaboloes, enneaboloes, and decaboloes. The name polytan is derived from Henri Picciotto's name tetratan and alludes to the ancient Chinese amusement of tangrams.

== Combinatorial enumeration ==
There are two ways in which a square in a polyabolo can consist of two isosceles right triangles, but polyaboloes are considered equivalent if they have the same boundaries. The number of nonequivalent polyaboloes composed of 1, 2, 3, … triangles is 1, 3, 4, 14, 30, 107, 318, 1116, 3743, … (sequence A006074 in the OEIS).

Polyaboloes that are confined strictly to the plane and cannot be turned over may be termed one-sided. The number of one-sided polyaboloes composed of 1, 2, 3, … triangles is 1, 4, 6, 22, 56, 198, 624, 2182, 7448, … (sequence A151519 in the OEIS).

As for a polyomino, a polyabolo that can be neither turned over nor rotated may be termed fixed. A polyabolo with no symmetries (rotation or reflection) corresponds to 8 distinct fixed polyaboloes.

A non-simply connected polyabolo is one that has one or more holes in it. The smallest value of n for which an n-abolo is non-simply connected is 7.

== Tiling rectangles with copies of a single polyabolo ==
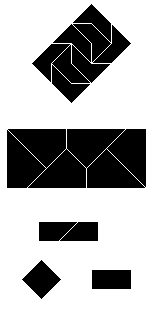
Tiling rectangles with polyaboloes.

In 1968, David A. Klarner defined the order of a polyomino. Similarly, the order of a polyabolo P can be defined as the minimum number of congruent copies of P that can be assembled (allowing translation, rotation, and reflection) to form a rectangle.

A polyabolo has order 1 if and only if it is itself a rectangle. Polyaboloes of order 2 are also easily recognisable. Solomon W. Golomb found polyaboloes, including a triabolo, of order 8. Michael Reid found a heptabolo of order 6. Higher orders are possible.

There are interesting tessellations of the Euclidean plane involving polyaboloes. One such is the tetrakis square tiling, a monohedral tessellation that fills the entire Euclidean plane with 45–45–90 triangles.

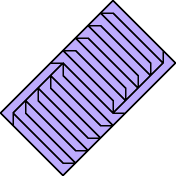
A polyabolo of order 20.

== Tiling a common figure with various polyaboloes ==
A minimal compatibility figure for the K and V tetraboloes.

The Compatibility Problem is to take two or more polyaboloes and find a figure that can be tiled with each. This problem has been studied far less than the Compatibility Problem for polyominoes. Systematic results first appeared in 2004 on Erich Friedman's website Math Magic.
