= Pseudo-polyomino =

Geometric shapes formed from squares

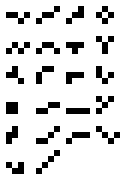
The 22 free tetrakings

A pseudo-polyomino, also called a polyking, polyplet or hinged polyomino, is a plane geometric figure formed by joining one or more equal squares edge-to-edge or corner-to-corner at 90°. It is a polyform with square cells. The polyominoes are a subset of the polykings.

The name "polyking" refers to the king in chess. The n-kings are the n-square shapes which could be occupied by a king on an infinite chessboard in the course of legal moves.

Golomb uses the term pseudo-polyomino referring to kingwise-connected sets of squares.

== Enumeration of polykings ==
10 congruent mutilated chessboards 7x7 constructed with the 94 pseudo-pentominoes, or pentaplets

=== Free, one-sided, and fixed polykings ===
There are three common ways of distinguishing polyominoes and polykings for enumeration:

- free polykings are distinct when none is a rigid transformation (translation, rotation, reflection or glide reflection) of another (pieces that can be picked up and flipped over).
- one-sided polykings are distinct when none is a translation or rotation of another (pieces that cannot be flipped over).
- fixed polykings are distinct when none is a translation of another (pieces that can be neither flipped nor rotated).

The following table shows the numbers of polykings of various types with n cells.

n	free	one-sided	fixed
1	1	1	1
2	2	2	4
3	5	6	20
4	22	34	110
5	94	166	638
6	524	991	3832
7	3,031	5,931	23,592
8	18,770	37,196	147,941
9	118,133	235,456	940,982
10	758,381	1,514,618	6,053,180
11	4,915,652	9,826,177	39,299,408
12	32,149,296	64,284,947	257,105,146
OEIS	A030222	A030233	A006770

Free polykings
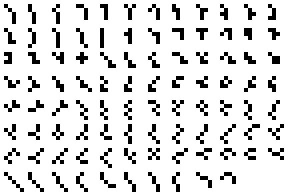
The 94 free pentakings.

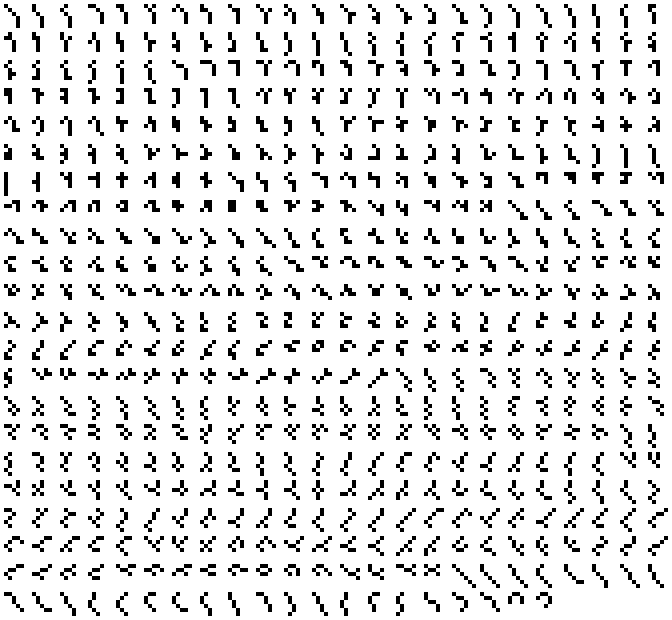
The 524 free hexakings.

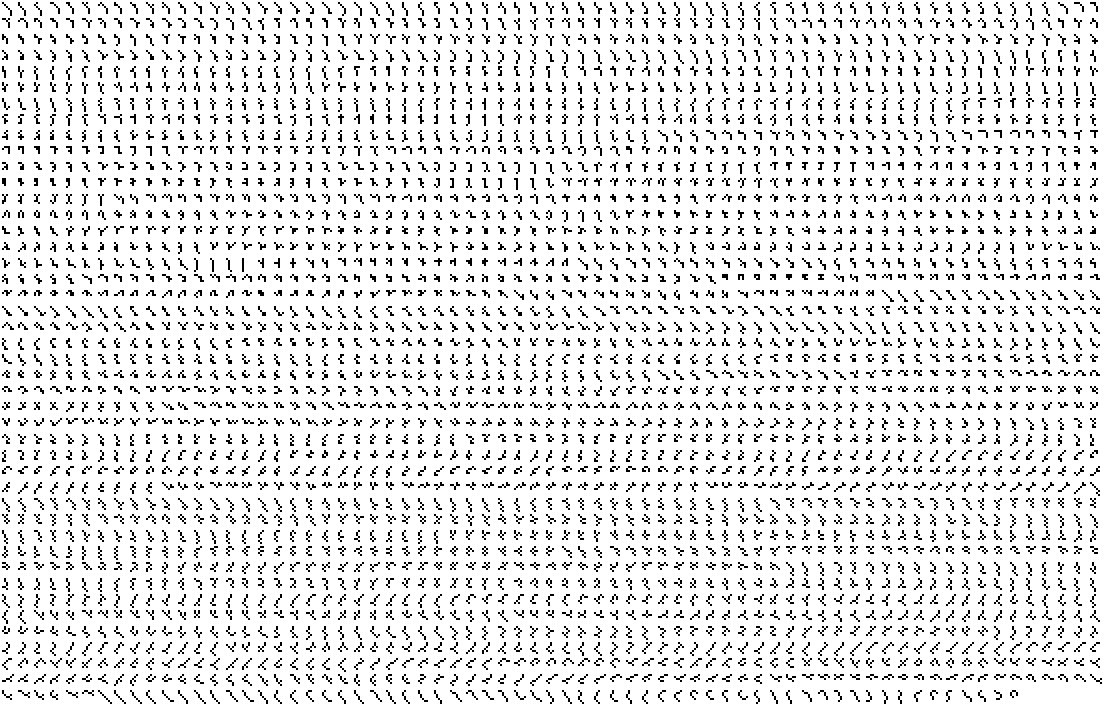
The 3,031 free heptakings.
