= Diabolical cube =

Three-dimensional packing puzzle

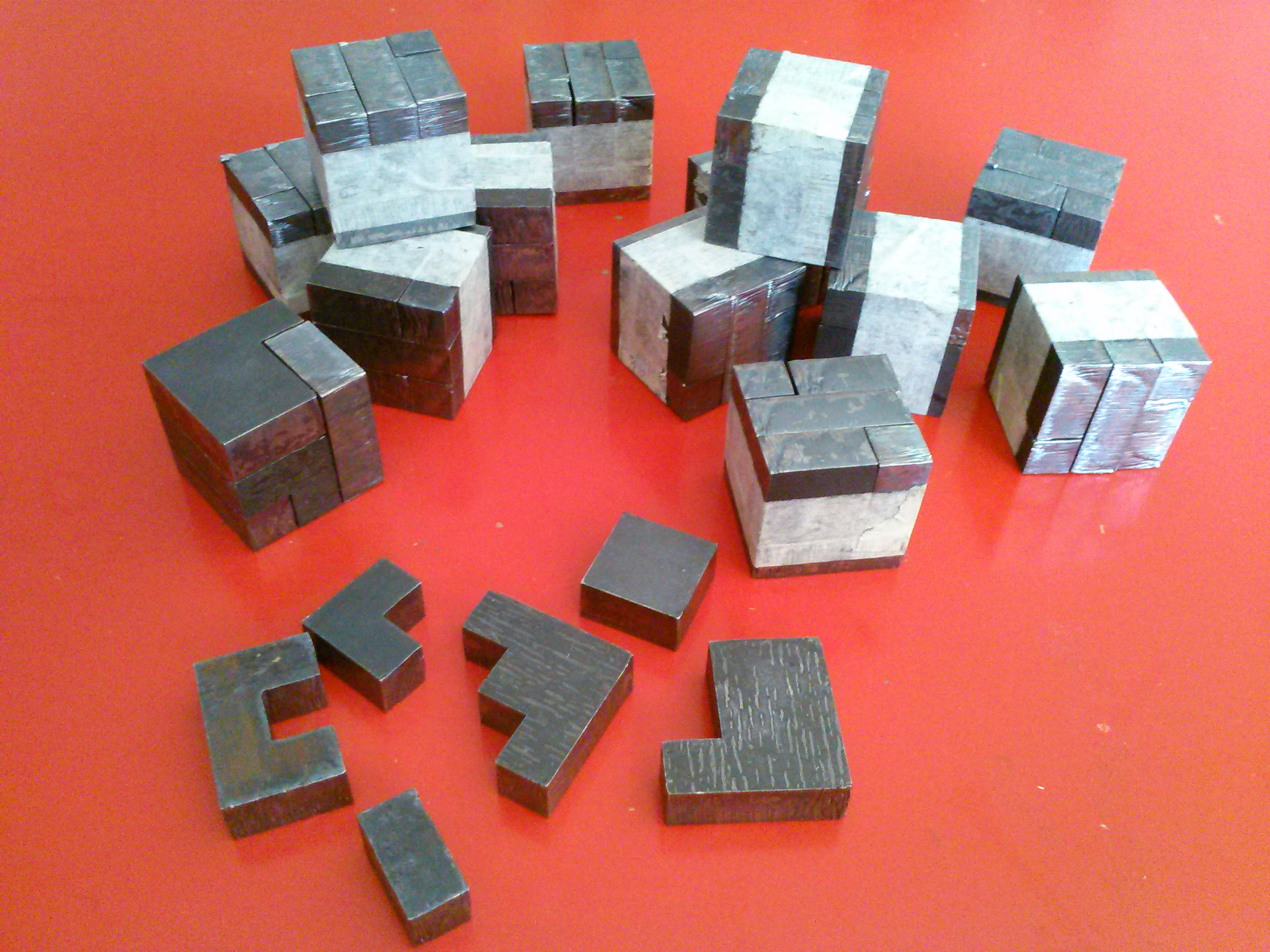
A disassembled diabolical cube and many assembled ones.

A solution for the Diabolical Cube puzzle – swapping the 2-cube (red) and 4-cube (yellow) blocks gives another

The diabolical cube is a three-dimensional dissection puzzle consisting of six polycubes (shapes formed by gluing cubes together face to face) that can be assembled together to form a single 3 × 3 × 3 cube. The six pieces are: one dicube, one tricube, one tetracube, one pentacube, one hexacube and one heptacube, that is, polycubes of 2, 3, 4, 5, 6 and 7 cubes.

There are many similar variations of this type of puzzle, including the Soma cube and the Slothouber–Graatsma puzzle, two other dissections of a 3 × 3 × 3 cube into polycubes which use seven and nine pieces respectively. However, Coffin (1991) writes that the diabolical cube appears to be the oldest puzzle of this type, first appearing in an 1893 book Puzzles Old and New by Professor Hoffmann (Angelo Lewis).

Because all of the pieces have only a single layer of cubes, their shape is unchanged by a mirror reflection, so a mirror reflection of a solution produces either the same solution or another valid solution. The puzzle has 13 different solutions, if mirrored pairs of solutions are not counted as being distinct from each other.
