= Soma cube =

Solid-dissection puzzle

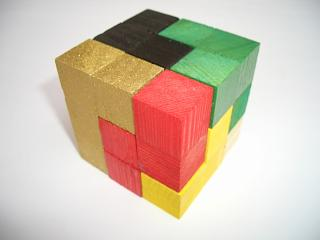
A fully assembled Soma cube

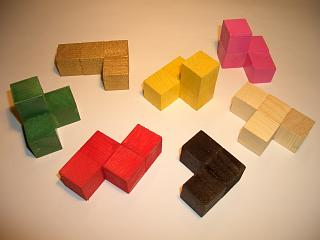
The pieces of a Soma cube

The Soma cube is a solid dissection puzzle invented by Danish polymath Piet Hein in 1933 during a lecture on quantum mechanics conducted by Werner Heisenberg.

Seven different pieces made out of unit cubes must be assembled into a 3×3×3 cube. The pieces can also be used to make a variety of other 3D shapes.

The pieces of the Soma cube consist of all possible combinations of at most four unit cubes, joined at their faces, such that at least one inside corner is formed. There are no combinations of one or two cubes that satisfy this condition, but one combination of three cubes and six combinations of four cubes that do. Thus, 3 + (6 × 4) is 27, which is exactly the number of cells in a 3×3×3 cube. Of these seven combinations, two are mirror images of each other (see Chirality).

The Soma cube was popularized by Martin Gardner in the September 1958 Mathematical Games column in Scientific American. The book Winning Ways for your Mathematical Plays also contains a detailed analysis of the Soma cube problem.

There are 240 distinct solutions of the Soma cube puzzle, excluding rotations and reflections: although the search space for a brute force solution is vast, these solutions can be quickly and easily generated by a simple backtracking search computer program similar to that used for the eight queens puzzle. John Horton Conway and Michael Guy first identified all 240 possible solutions by hand in 1961.

== Pieces ==
The seven Soma pieces are six polycubes of order four, and one of order three:

Piece 1, or "V".
Piece 2, or "L":	A row of three blocks with one added below the left side.
Piece 3, or "T":	A row of three blocks with one added below the center.
Piece 4, or "Z":	Bent tetromino with block placed on outside of clockwise side.
Piece 5, or "A":	Unit cube placed on top of clockwise side. Chiral in 3D. (Left arm)
Piece 6, or "B":	Unit cube placed on top of anticlockwise side. Chiral in 3D. (Right arm)
Piece 7, or "P":	Unit cube placed on bend. Not chiral in 3D.

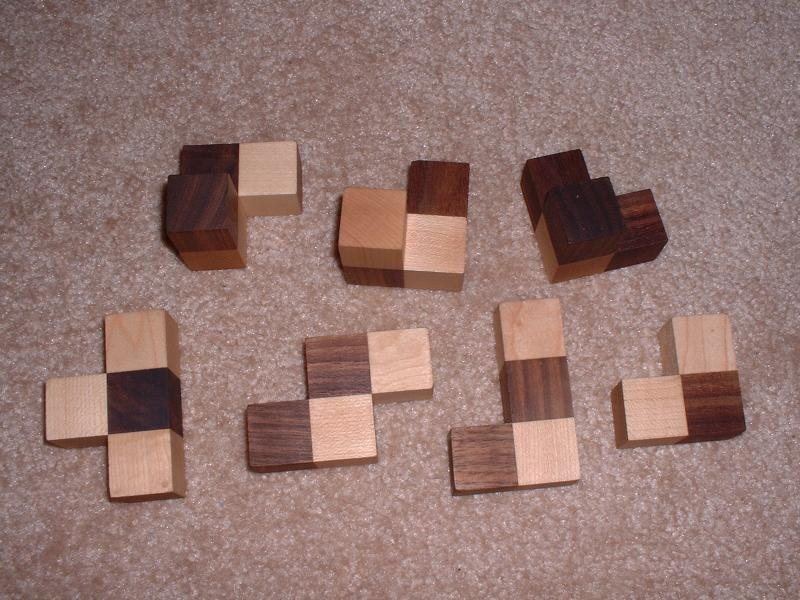
In a common version the constitute cubes of each piece alternate in lightness (14 white and 13 dark)

== Production ==
Piet Hein authorized a finely crafted rosewood version of the Soma cube manufactured by Theodor Skjøde Knudsen's company Skjøde Skjern (of Denmark). Beginning in about 1967, it was marketed in the U.S. for several years by the game manufacturer Parker Brothers. Plastic Soma cube sets were also commercially produced by Parker Brothers in several colors (blue, red, and orange) during the 1970s. The package for the Parker Brothers version claimed there were 1,105,920 possible solutions. This figure includes rotations and reflections of each solution as well as rotations of the individual pieces. The puzzle is currently sold as a logic game by Piet Hein Trading and by ThinkFun (formerly Binary Arts) under the name Block by Block.

Online assembling of Soma Cube pieces to a variety of structures besides a cube is offered as a web application, as iPAD application SomaBox, and as a virtual reality application ARSoma.

== Solutions ==
One method of assembly

Solving the Soma cube has been used as a task to measure individuals' performance and effort in a series of psychology experiments. In these experiments, test subjects are asked to solve a soma cube as many times as possible within a set period of time. For example, In 1969, Edward Deci, a Carnegie Mellon University graduate assistant at the time, asked his research subjects to solve a soma cube under conditions with varying incentives in his dissertation work on intrinsic and extrinsic motivation establishing the social psychological theory of crowding out.

In each of the 240 distinct solutions to the cube puzzle, there is only one place that the "T" piece can be placed. Each solved cube can be rotated such that the "T" piece is on the bottom with its long edge along the front and the "tongue" of the "T" in the bottom center cube (this is the normalized position of the large cube). This can be proven as follows: If you consider all the possible ways that the "T" piece can be placed in the large cube (without regard to any of the other pieces), it will be seen that it will always fill either two corners of the large cube or zero corners. There is no way to orient the "T" piece such that it fills only one corner of the large cube. The "L" piece can be oriented such that it fills two corners, or one corner, or zero corners. Each of the other five pieces have no orientation that fills two corners; they can fill either one corner or zero corners. Therefore, if you exclude the "T" piece, the maximum number of corners that can be filled by the remaining six pieces is seven (one corner each for five pieces, plus two corners for the "L" piece). A cube has eight corners. But the "T" piece cannot be oriented to fill just that one remaining corner, and orienting it such that it fills zero corners will obviously not make a cube. Therefore, the "T" must always fill two corners, and there is only one orientation (discounting rotations and reflections) in which it does that. It also follows from this that in all solutions, five of the remaining six pieces will fill their maximum number of corners and one piece will fill one fewer than its maximum (this is called the deficient piece).

== Figures ==
Selected figures in the SOMA manual

In addition to constructing a cube, the Soma manual provides assorted figures to construct with the seven pieces. The figure on the right shows solutions to some of the figures in the same colour scheme.

== Similar puzzles ==
Another puzzle similar to the Soma cube is the 3D pentomino puzzle, which can fill boxes of 2×3×10, 2×5×6 and 3×4×5 units.

The Bedlam cube is a 4×4×4 sided cube puzzle consisting of twelve pentacubes and one tetracube. The Diabolical cube is a puzzle of six polycubes that can be assembled together to form a single 3×3×3 cube.

Eye Level also makes use of the Thinking Cube (once students are in levels 30-32 of Basic Thinking Math or levels 29-32 of Critical Thinking Math), as one of its Teaching Tools, similar to the Soma cube.

Rubik's Bricks, a puzzle produced under the Rubik's branding, is a similar puzzle made of 27 cubes, but the pieces are formed by joining cubes either by faces or by edges. There are exactly 9 such ways to join three cubes, so the puzzle can make a 3x3x3 cube. The individual cubes are colored in such a way as to give a unique solution.

== See also ==
- Bedlam cube
- Conway puzzle
- Diabolical cube
- Herzberger Quader
- Pentomino
- Slothouber–Graatsma puzzle
- Snake cube
- Tangram
- Tetromino
- Tromino
