= Bedlam cube =

Three-dimensional packing puzzle

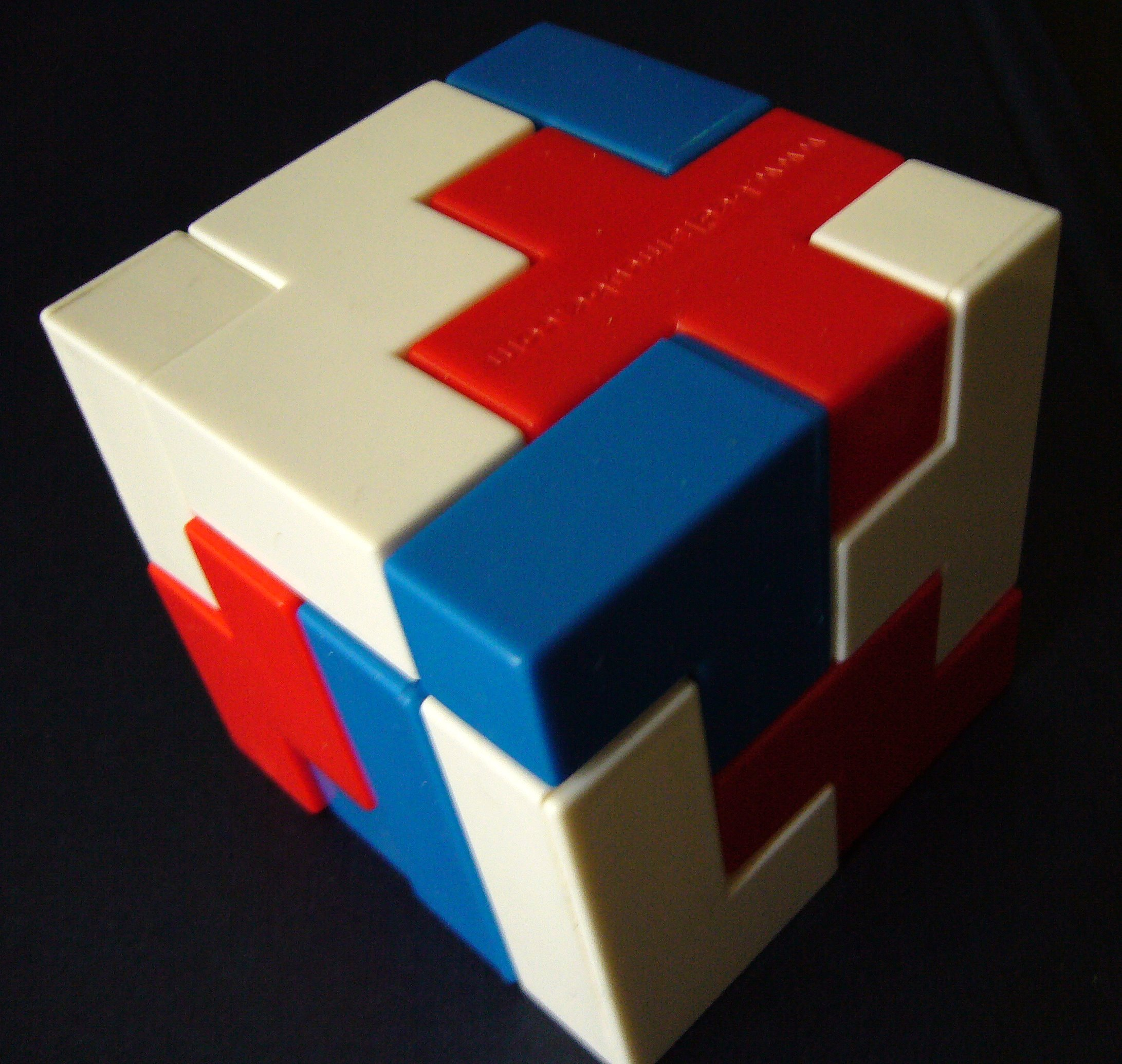
Bedlam cube

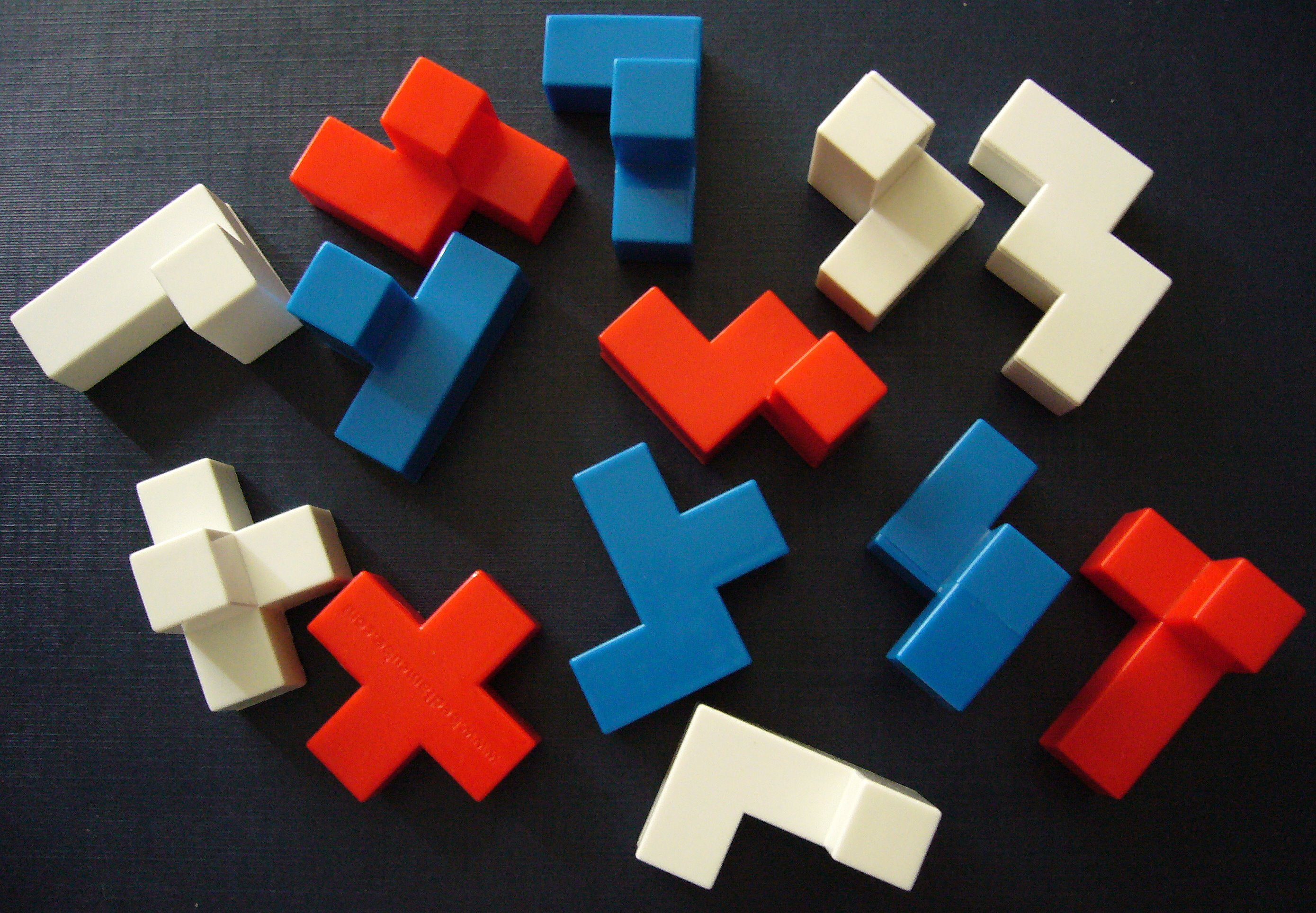
Bedlam cube elements

A solution to the Bedlam cube puzzle

The Bedlam cube is a solid dissection puzzle invented by British puzzle expert Bruce Bedlam.

== Design ==
The puzzle consists of thirteen polycubic pieces: twelve pentacubes and one tetracube. The objective is to assemble these pieces into a 4 x 4 x 4 cube. There are 19,186 distinct ways of doing so, up to rotations and reflections.

The Bedlam cube is one unit per side larger than the 3 x 3 x 3 Soma cube, and is much more difficult to solve.

== History ==
Two of the BBC's 'Dragons' from Dragons' Den, Rachel Elnaugh and Theo Paphitis, were to invest in the Bedlam cube during the 2005 series. They offered £100,000 for a 30% share of equity in Bedlam Puzzles. Danny Bamping (the entrepreneur behind Bedlam cube) finally chose a bank loan instead of their investment, as seen in the relevant "Where Are They Now" episode of Dragons' Den.

== Records ==
According to Guinness World Records, the uncontested world record for assembling the Bedlam Cube is 11.03 seconds by Danny Bamping on 9 November 2006. The blindfolded record is 27.21 seconds by Aleksandr Iljasov on 25 February 2008.

== See also ==
- Slothouber–Graatsma puzzle
- Conway puzzle
- Polycube
- Soma cube
