= Polystick =

Shapes made from regular line segments

In recreational mathematics, a polystick (or polyedge) is a polyform with a line segment (a 'stick') as the basic shape. A polystick is a connected set of segments in a regular grid. A square polystick is a connected subset of a regular square grid. A triangular polystick is a connected subset of a regular triangular grid. Polysticks are classified according to how many line segments they contain.

The name "polystick" seems to have been coined by Brian R. Barwell.

The names "polytrig" and "polytwigs" has been proposed by David Goodger to simplify the phrases "triangular-grid polysticks" and "hexagonal-grid polysticks," respectively. Colin F. Brown has used an earlier term "polycules" for the hexagonal-grid polysticks due to their appearance resembling the spicules of sea sponges.

There is no standard term for line segments built on other regular tilings, an unstructured grid, or a simple connected graph, but both "polynema" and "polyedge" have been proposed.

When reflections are considered distinct we have the one-sided polysticks. When rotations and reflections are not considered to be distinct shapes, we have the free polysticks. Thus, for example, there are 7 one-sided square tristicks because two of the five shapes have left and right versions.

Square Polysticks
Sticks	Name	Free OEIS: A019988	One-Sided OEIS: A151537
1	monostick	1	1
2	distick	2	2
3	tristick	5	7
4	tetrastick	16	25
5	pentastick	55	99
6	hexastick	222	416
7	heptastick	950	1854

Hexagonal Polysticks
Sticks	Name	Free OEIS: A197459	One-Sided OEIS: A197460
1	monotwig	1	1
2	ditwig	1	1
3	tritwigs	3	4
4	tetratwigs	4	6
5	pentatwigs	12	19
6	hexatwigs	27	49
7	heptatwigs	78	143

Triangular Polysticks
Sticks	Name	Free OEIS: A159867	One-Sided OEIS: A151539
1	monostick	1	1
2	distick	3	3
3	tristick	12	19
4	tetrastick	60	104
5	pentastick	375	719
6	hexastick	2613	5123
7	heptastick	19074	37936

The set of n-sticks that contain no closed loops is equivalent, with some duplications, to the set of (n+1)-ominos, as each vertex at the end of every line segment can be replaced with a single square of a polyomino. For example, the set of tristicks is equivalent to the set of Tetrominos. In general, an n-stick with m loops is equivalent to a (n−m+1)-omino (as each loop means that one line segment does not add a vertex to the figure).

== Diagram ==
The free square polysticks of sizes 1 through 4, including 1 monostick (red), 2 disticks (green), 5 tristicks (blue), and 16 tetrasticks (black).
