= Herzberger Quader =

Three-dimensional packing puzzle

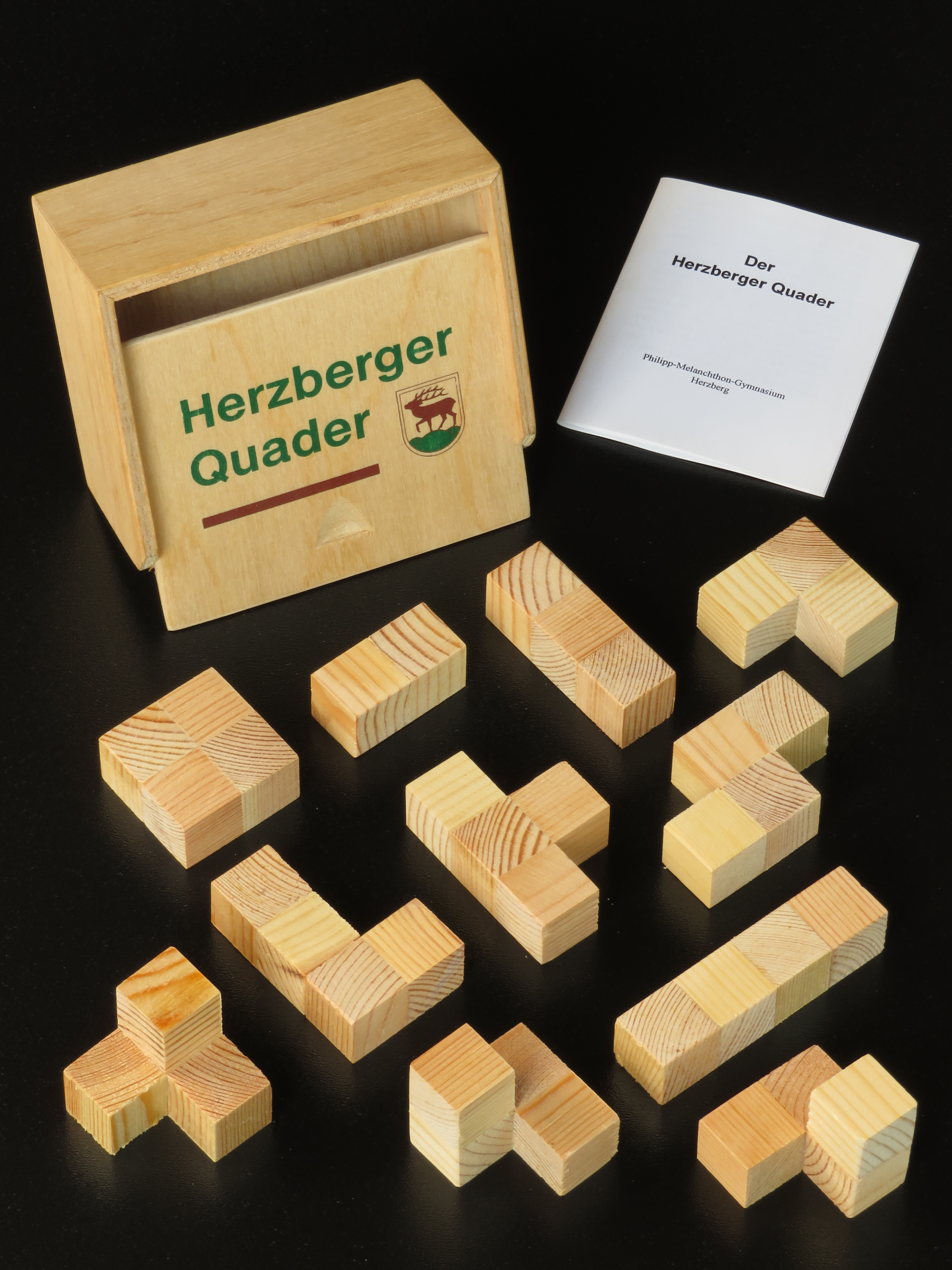
The Herzberger Quader, as it was published on the occasion of the 50th anniversary of high school graduation in Herzberg

The Herzberger Quader is a solid dissection puzzle invented by German mathematics teacher Gerhard Schulze. It was named after his home-town Herzberg, and Quader is the latin-derived German word for a rectangular cuboid.

== Design ==
The Herzberger Quader pieces packed into a 2 × 4 × 5 cuboid

The Herzberger Quader consists of a set of all possible polycubes from dicube to tetracubes. The eleven pieces together have 40 unit cubes and thus can be stored in a 2 × 4 × 5 box.

== Possible problems ==
Some Soma cube figures assembled from the non-cuboidal Herzberger Quader pieces

Besides stowing the Herzberger Quader in its box there are a lot of figures that can be built using all parts. Various subsets can be used to form a 3 × 3 × 3 cube, one of them is the famous Soma cube.

Much more demanding tasks ask for the number of all different possibilities to arrange the initial parts in a certain figure. Or proofs are to be given for which figures can be realized or not realized with which polycubes.

== History ==
Author of the Herzberger Quader is Oberstudienrat Gerhard Schulze (1919–1995), who was intensively engaged in mathematical games during his extracurricular activities in the years 1982–1994. On the occasion of the 800th anniversary of his hometown Herzberg in 1984, the Herzberger Quader was produced for the first time and thus made known to a broad public. Today, the Herzberger Quader is suggested to be used in the context of mathematics education.
