= Sujiko =

Logic puzzle

Sujiko is a logic-based, combinatorial number-placement puzzle created by Jai Gomer of Kobayaashi Studios.

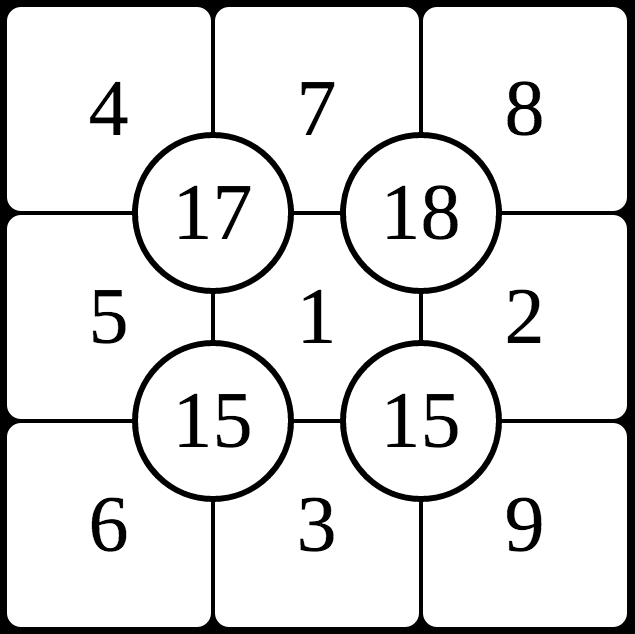
A completed Sujiko puzzle.

The puzzle takes place on a 3x3 grid with four circled number clues at the centre of each quadrant which indicate the sum of the four numbers in that quadrant. The numbers 1-9 must be placed in the grid, in accordance with the circled clues, to complete the puzzle.

Sujiko is featured in UK newspapers including The Times, The Telegraph, and The Sun.
