= Polycube =

Shape made from cubes joined together

All 8 one-sided tetracubes – if chirality is ignored, the bottom 2 in grey are considered the same, giving 7 free tetracubes in total

A puzzle involving arranging nine L tricubes into a 3×3×3 cube

A polycube is an orthogonal polyhedron formed by joining one or more equal cubes face to face. Polycubes are the three-dimensional analogues of the planar polyominoes. The Soma cube, the Bedlam cube, the Diabolical cube, the Slothouber–Graatsma puzzle, and the Conway puzzle are examples of packing problems based on polycubes.

== Enumerating polycubes ==
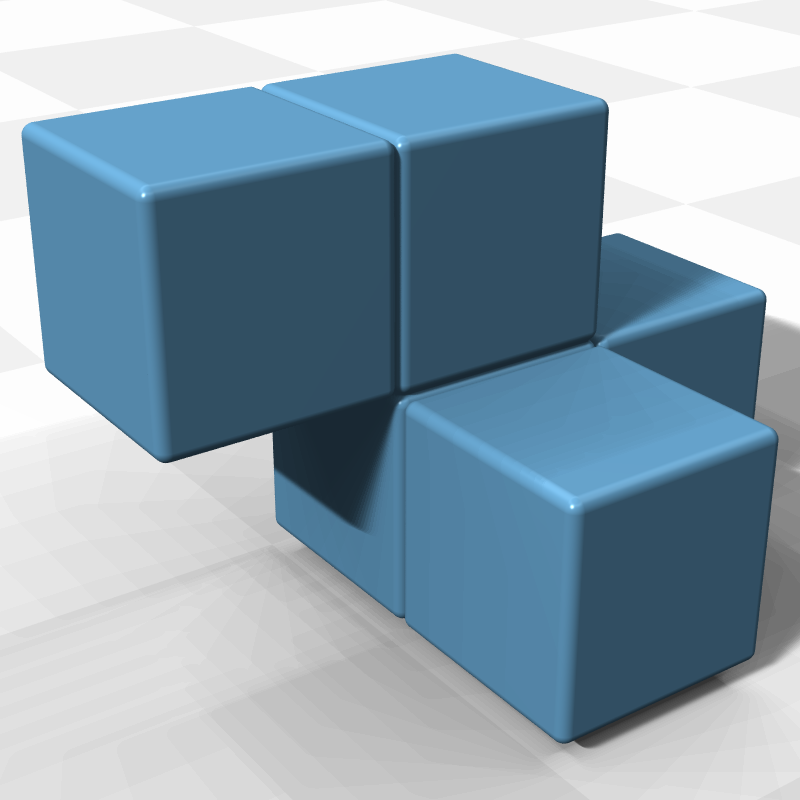
A chiral pentacube

Like polyominoes, polycubes can be enumerated in two ways, depending on whether chiral pairs of polycubes (those equivalent by mirror reflection, but not by using only translations and rotations) are counted as one polycube or two. For example, 6 tetracubes are achiral and one is chiral, giving a count of 7 or 8 tetracubes respectively. Unlike polyominoes, polycubes are usually counted with mirror pairs distinguished, because one cannot turn a polycube over to reflect it as one can a polyomino given three dimensions. In particular, the Soma cube uses both forms of the chiral tetracube.

O
"square tetracube"

Z is the same as S in 3D

T
"T-tetracube"

J is the same as L in 3D

I
"straight tetracube"

D
"Right Screw"

B
"Branch"

F
"Left Screw"

Polycubes are classified according to how many cubical cells they have:

n	Name of n-polycube	Number of one-sided n-polycubes (reflections counted as distinct) (sequence A000162 in the OEIS)	Number of free n-polycubes (reflections counted together) (sequence A038119 in the OEIS)
1	monocube	1	1
2	dicube	1	1
3	tricube	2	2
4	tetracube	8	7
5	pentacube	29	23
6	hexacube	166	112
7	heptacube	1023	607
8	octacube	6922	3811

Fixed polycubes (both reflections and rotations counted as distinct (sequence A001931 in the OEIS)), one-sided polycubes, and free polycubes have been enumerated up to n=22. Specific families of polycubes have also been investigated. It was proven that the number of fixed polycubes of size n grows as an exponential function of n, with bounds for the growth constant 6.3795 ≤ λ_{3} ≤ 9.3835.

== Symmetries of polycubes ==
As with polyominoes, polycubes may be classified according to how many symmetries they have. Polycube symmetries (conjugacy classes of subgroups of the achiral octahedral group) were first enumerated by W. F. Lunnon in 1972. Most polycubes are asymmetric, but many have more complex symmetry groups, all the way up to the full symmetry group of the cube with 48 elements. There are 33 different symmetry types that a polycube can have (including asymmetry).

== Properties of pentacubes ==
12 pentacubes are flat and correspond to the pentominoes. 5 of the remaining 17 have mirror symmetry, and the other 12 form 6 chiral pairs.

The bounding boxes of the pentacubes have sizes 5×1×1, 4×2×1, 3×3×1, 3×2×1, 3×2×2, and 2×2×2.

A polycube may have up to 24 orientations in the cubic lattice, or 48, if reflection is allowed. Of the pentacubes, 2 flats (5-1-1 and the cross) have mirror symmetry in all three axes; these have only three orientations. 10 have one mirror symmetry; these have 12 orientations. Each of the remaining 17 pentacubes has 24 orientations.

== Octacube and hypercube unfoldings ==
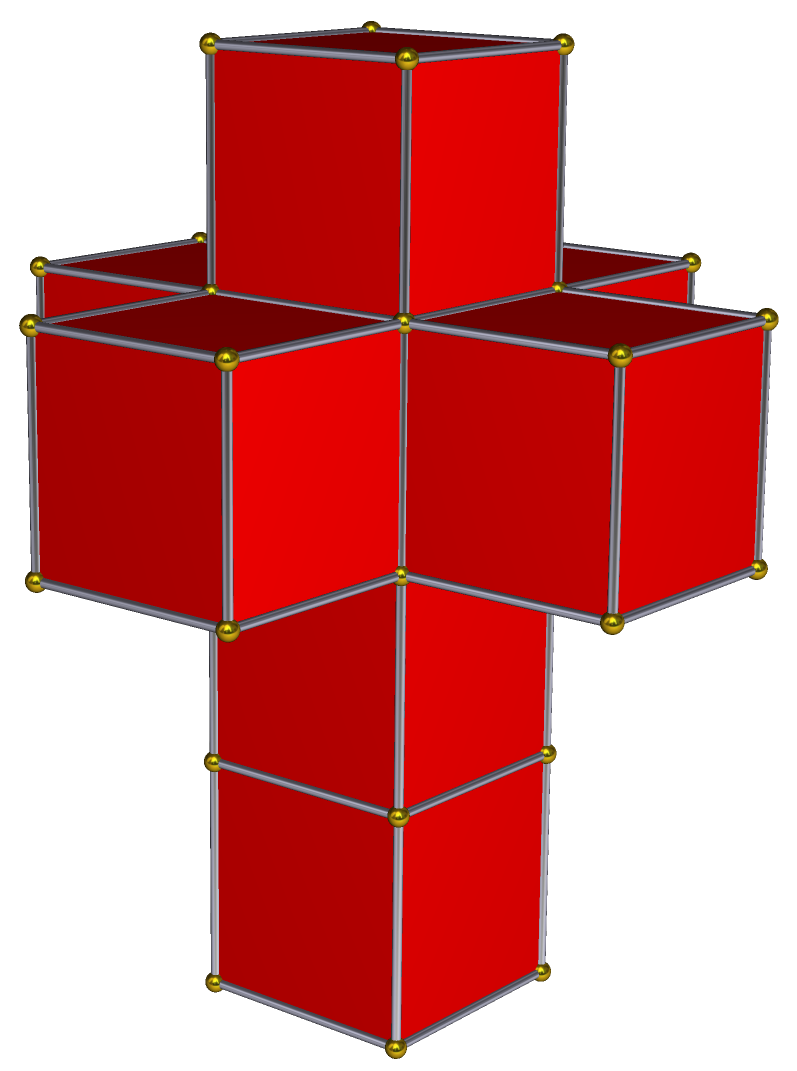
The Dalí cross

The tesseract (four-dimensional hypercube) has eight cubes as its facets, and just as the cube can be unfolded into a hexomino, the tesseract can be unfolded into an octacube. One unfolding, in particular, mimics the well-known unfolding of a cube into a Latin cross: it consists of four cubes stacked one on top of each other, with another four cubes attached to the exposed square faces of the second-from-top cube of the stack, to form a three-dimensional double cross shape. Salvador Dalí used this shape in his 1954 painting Crucifixion (Corpus Hypercubus) and it is described in Robert A. Heinlein's 1940 short story "And He Built a Crooked House". In honor of Dalí, this octacube has been called the Dalí cross. It can tile space.

More generally (answering a question posed by Martin Gardner in 1966), out of all 3811 different free octacubes, 261 are unfoldings of the tesseract.

Unlike in three dimensions in which distances between vertices of a polycube with unit edges excludes √7 due to Legendre's three-square theorem, Lagrange's four-square theorem states that the analogue in four dimensions yields square roots of every natural number

== Boundary connectivity ==
Although the cubes of a polycube are required to be connected square-to-square, the squares of its boundary are not required to be connected edge-to-edge. For instance, the 26-cube formed by making a 3×3×3 grid of cubes and then removing the center cube is a valid polycube, in which the boundary of the interior void is not connected to the exterior boundary. It is also not required that the boundary of a polycube form a manifold. For instance, one of the pentacubes has two cubes that meet edge-to-edge, so that the edge between them is the side of four boundary squares.

If a polycube has the additional property that its complement (the set of integer cubes that do not belong to the polycube) is connected by paths of cubes meeting square-to-square, then the boundary squares of the polycube are necessarily also connected by paths of squares meeting edge-to-edge. That is, in this case the boundary forms a polyominoid.

Unsolved problem in mathematics
Can every polycube with a connected boundary be unfolded to a polyomino? If so, can every such polycube be unfolded to a polyomino that tiles the plane?
More unsolved problems in mathematics

Every k-cube with k < 7 as well as the Dalí cross (with k = 8) can be unfolded to a polyomino that tiles the plane. It is an open problem whether every polycube with a connected boundary can be unfolded to a polyomino, or whether this can always be done with the additional condition that the polyomino tiles the plane.

== Dual graph ==
The structure of a polycube can be visualized by means of a "dual graph" that has a vertex for each cube and an edge for each two cubes that share a square. This is different from the similarly-named notions of a dual polyhedron, and of the dual graph of a surface-embedded graph.

Dual graphs have also been used to define and study special subclasses of the polycubes, such as the ones whose dual graph is a tree.

== See also ==
- Herzberger Quader
- Tripod packing
