= Snake cube =

3-D mechanical puzzle

The 27-cube snake cube puzzle laid flat (top) and packed into a 3×3×3 cube (bottom, exploded view) – cubelets with straight holes are outlined

The snake cube is a mechanical puzzle, a chain of 27 or 64 cubelets, connected by an elastic band running through them. The band runs straight through certain cubes, but bends 90° in others, creating a specific sequence of straight and bent connections. The cubelets can rotate freely. The aim of the puzzle is to arrange the chain in such a way that they will form a 3×3×3 or 4×4×4 cube. While all commercially available 3×3×3 cubes appear to be identical in terms of the sequence of straight and bent connections, and have only one solution (up to symmetry), at least two different 4×4×4 cubes are sold, both having four unique solutions.

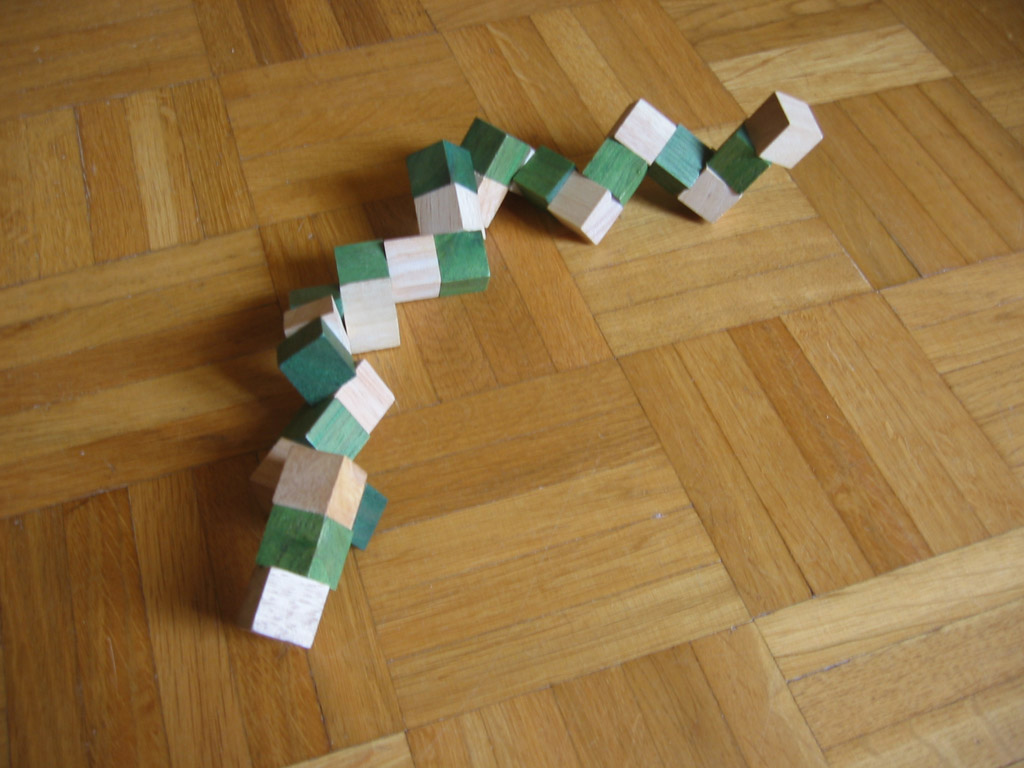
Unsolved 3×3×3 cube (forming a snake)

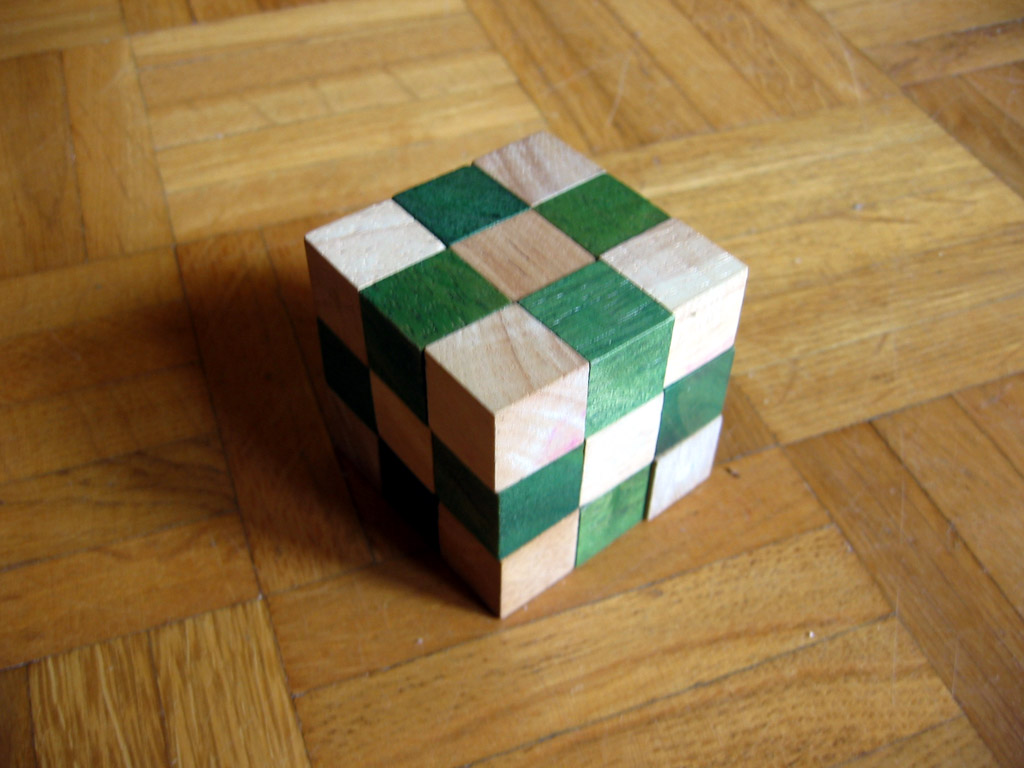
Solved 3×3×3 cube

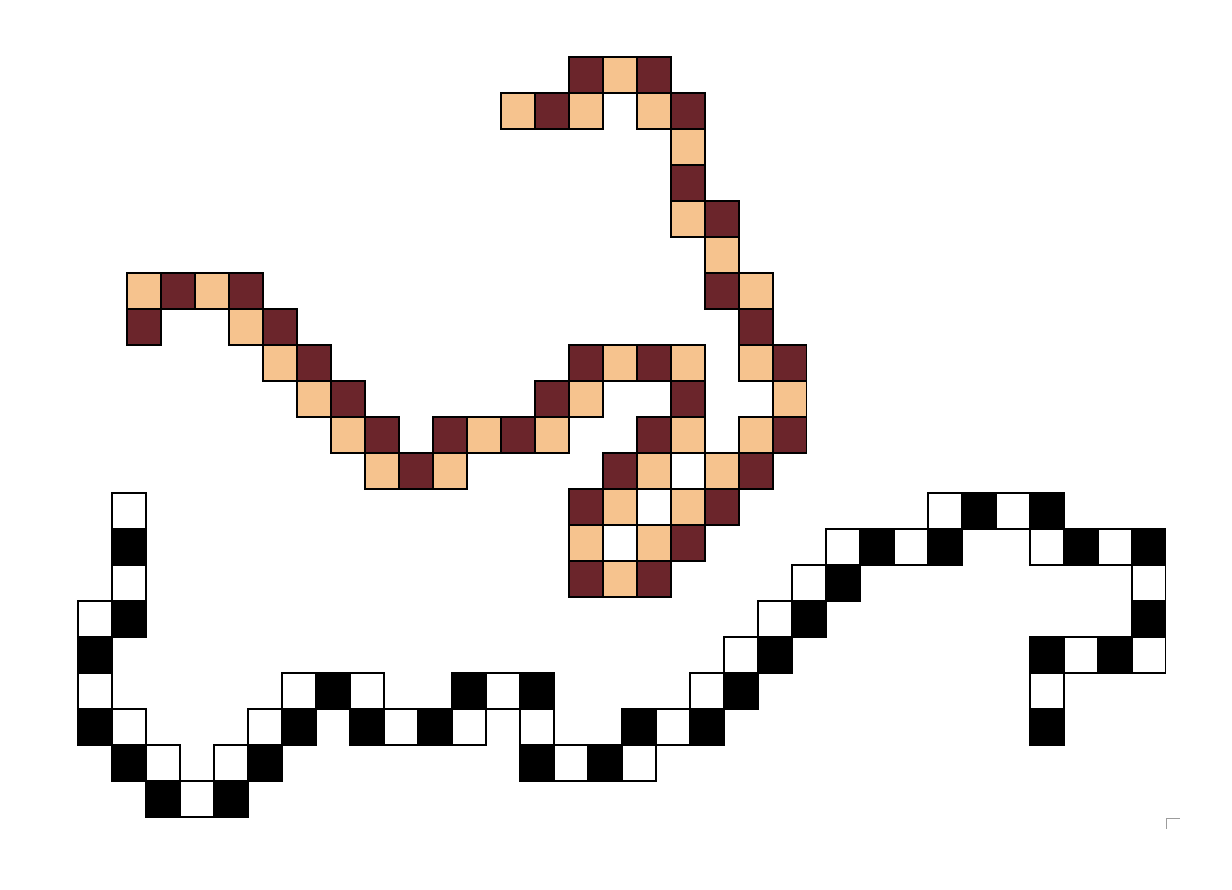
Two unsolved 4×4×4 cubes

== Variations ==
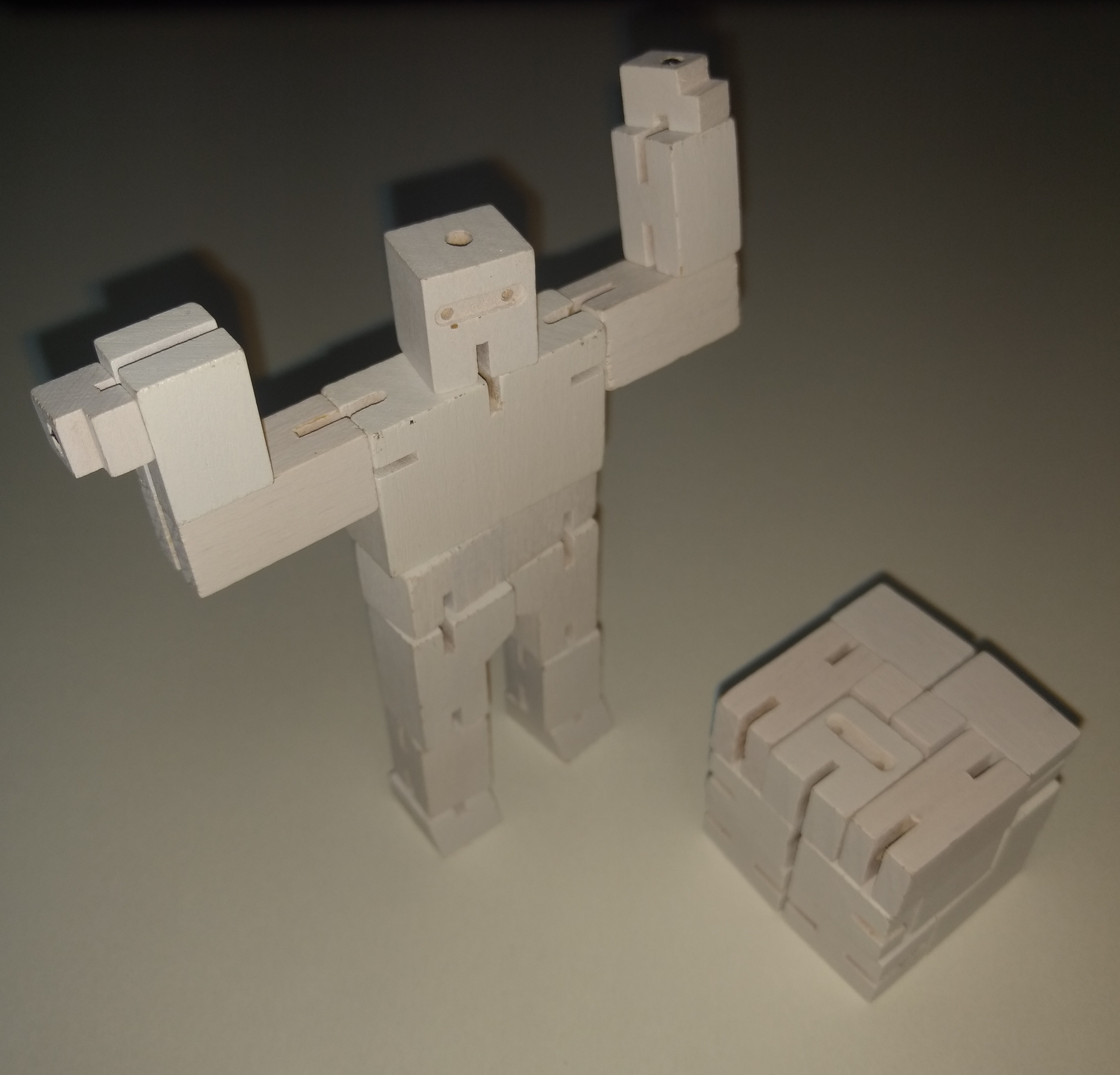
Variant : from wooden cube to puzzle man.

A variation on the puzzle is a Kibble cube, which is also a string of cubes but has slots on the cubes. There are also many different styles of the cube. It can be made up of wood or plastic and can vary in colour, material and size.
