= Slothouber–Graatsma puzzle =

Three-dimensional packing problem

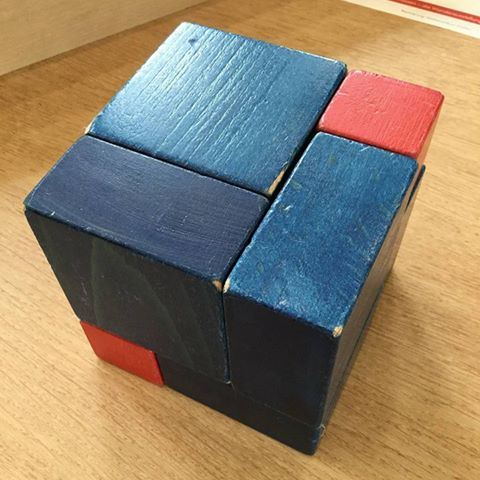
A physical solved Slothouber–Graatsma puzzle

The Slothouber–Graatsma puzzle is a packing problem that calls for packing six 1 × 2 × 2 blocks and three 1 × 1 × 1 blocks into a 3 × 3 × 3 box (all shapes being right angled). The solution to this puzzle is unique (up to mirror reflections and rotations). It was named after its inventors Jan Slothouber and William Graatsma.

The puzzle is essentially the same if the three 1 × 1 × 1 blocks are left out, so that the task is to pack six 1 × 2 × 2 blocks into a cubic box with volume 27.

== Solution ==
Solution of Slothouber-Graatsma puzzle in exploded view with colour denoting orientation

The solution of the Slothouber–Graatsma puzzle is straightforward when one realizes that the three 1 × 1 × 1 blocks (or the three holes) need to be placed along a body diagonal of the box, as each of the 3 × 3 layers in the various directions needs to contain such a unit block. This follows from parity considerations, because the larger blocks can only fill an even number of the nine cells in each 3 × 3 layer.

== Variations ==
The Slothouber–Graatsma puzzle is an example of a cube-packing puzzle using convex polycubes. More general puzzles involving the packing of convex rectangular blocks exist. The best known example is the Conway puzzle which asks for the packing of eighteen convex rectangular blocks into a 5 × 5 × 5 box. Another 5 × 5 × 5 puzzle attributed to Conway includes six 1 × 2 × 4 and six 2 × 2 × 3 blocks with a solution similar to the Slothouber-Graatsma puzzle. A harder convex rectangular block packing problem is to pack forty-one 1 × 2 × 4 blocks into a 7 × 7 × 7 box (thereby leaving fifteen unit holes); the solution is analogous to the 5 × 5 × 5 case, and has three 1 × 1 × 5 cuboidal holes in mutually perpendicular directions covering all seven slices.

== See also ==
- Soma cube
- Bedlam cube
- Diabolical cube
- Herzberger Quader (right cuboid)
