= Conway puzzle =

Three-dimensional packing problem

Pieces used in the Conway puzzle

Conway's puzzle, or blocks-in-a-box, is a packing problem using rectangular blocks, named after its inventor, mathematician John Conway. It calls for packing thirteen 1 × 2 × 4 blocks, one 2 × 2 × 2 block, one 1 × 2 × 2 block, and three 1 × 1 × 3 blocks into a 5 × 5 × 5 box.

== Solution ==
A possible placement for the three 1×1×3 blocks – the vertical block has corners touching corners of the two horizontal blocks

The solution of the Conway puzzle is straightforward once one realizes, based on parity considerations, that the three 1 × 1 × 3 blocks need to be placed so that precisely one of them appears in each 5 × 5 × 1 slice of the cube. This is analogous to similar insight that facilitates the solution of the simpler Slothouber–Graatsma puzzle.

A step-by-step solution to the Conway puzzle

== See also ==
- Soma cube
