= Mechanical puzzle =

Mechanically-interlinked pieces to be manipulated

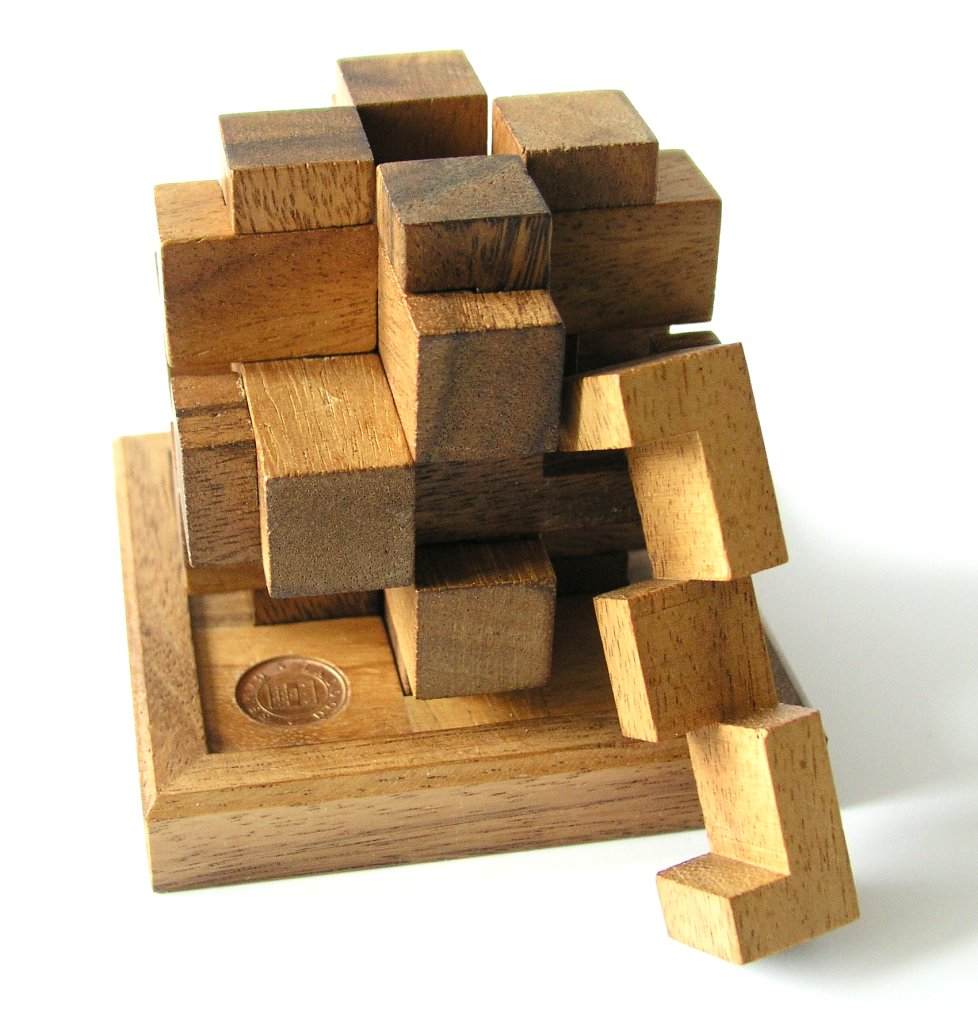
Mechanical puzzle design by W. Altekruse, patented in 1890. The puzzle consists of twelve identical pieces which must be fitted together.

A mechanical puzzle is a puzzle presented as a set of mechanically interlinked pieces which the player must manipulate to reach a prescribed “solution”. The best-known puzzle of this kind is the Rubik's Cube, invented by the Hungarian architect Ernő Rubik in 1974. The puzzles are typically designed for a single player: the goal is for the player to discover the principle of the object, rather than coming up with the right solution through trial and error. With this in mind, they are often used as an intelligence test or in problem solving training.

== History ==
The oldest known mechanical puzzle comes from Greece and appeared in the 3rd century BC. The game consists of a square divided into 14 parts, and the aim was to create different shapes from these pieces.

In Iran "puzzle-locks" were made as early as the 17th century AD.

The next known occurrence of puzzles is in Japan. In 1742 there is a mention of a game called "Sei Shona-gon Chie No-Ita" in a book. Around the year 1800 the Tangram puzzle from China became popular, and 20 years later it had spread through Europe and America.

The company Richter from Rudolstadt began producing large amounts of Tangram-like puzzles of different shapes, the so-called "Anker-puzzles" in about 1891.

In 1893, Angelo John Lewis, using the pen name "Professor Hoffman", wrote a book called Puzzles; Old and New. It contained, among other things, more than 40 descriptions of puzzles with secret opening mechanisms. This book grew into a reference work for puzzle games and modern copies exist for those interested.

The beginning of the 20th century was a time in which puzzles were greatly fashionable and the first patents for puzzles were recorded.

With the invention of modern polymers manufacture of many puzzles became easier and cheaper.

In 1993, Jerry Slocum founded the Slocum Puzzle Foundation, a non-profit organization dedicated to educating the public on puzzles through puzzle collecting, exhibitions, publications, and communications.

== Categories ==
=== Assembly ===
In this category, the puzzle is present in component form, and the aim is to produce a certain shape. The Soma cube made by Piet Hein, the Pentomino by Solomon Golomb and the aforementioned laying puzzles Tangram and "Anker-puzzles" are all examples of this type of puzzle. Furthermore, problems in which a number of pieces have to be arranged so as to fit into a (seemingly too small) box are also classed in this category.

A solution to Hoffman's packing puzzle with 4×5×6 cuboids (1), exploded to show each layer (2)

The image shows an example of Hoffman's packing puzzle. The aim is to pack 27 cuboids with side lengths $A, B, C$ into a box of side length $A+B+C$, subject to two constraints:

1) $A, B, C$ must not be equal
2) The smallest of $A, B, C$ must be larger than $(A+B+C)/4$

One possibility would be $A=9, B=10, C=11$ – the box would then have to have the dimensions 30×30×30.

Modern tools such as laser cutters allow the creation of complex two-dimensional puzzles made of wood or acrylic plastic. In recent times this has become predominant and puzzles of extraordinarily decorative geometry have been designed. This makes use of the multitude of ways of subdividing areas into repeating shapes.

Computers aid in the design of new puzzles. A computer allows an exhaustive search for solution – with its help a puzzle may be designed in such a way that it has the fewest possible solutions, or a solution requiring the most steps possible. The consequence is that solving the puzzle can be very difficult.

The use of transparent materials enables the creation of puzzles, in which pieces have to be stacked on top of each other. The aim is to create a specific pattern, image or colour scheme in the solution. For example, one puzzle consists of several discs in which angular sections of varying sizes are differently coloured. The discs have to be stacked so as to create a colour circle (red->blue->green->red) around the discs.

==== Pyramid puzzles ====
A pyramid puzzle consists of two or more component pieces which fit together to create a pyramid. Two-piece pyramid puzzles cannot form a regular pyramid and can only form a 4 faced tetrahedron pyramid. The solution involves facing the square faces to each other and twisting one upright to complete the four faced tetrahedronic pyramid. There are also four-piece pyramid puzzles.

=== Disassembly ===
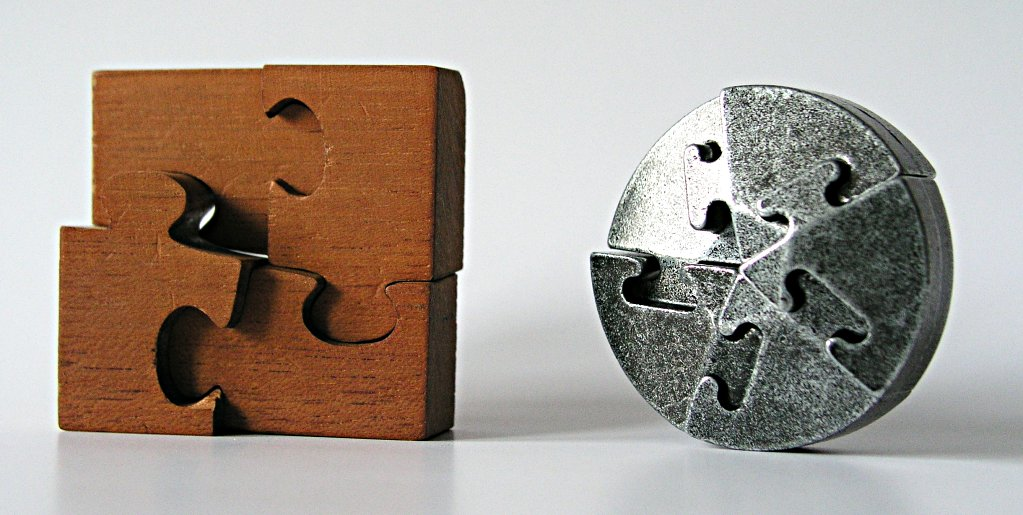
Disassembly puzzles

The puzzles in this category are usually solved by opening or dividing them into pieces. This includes those puzzles with secret opening mechanisms, which are to be opened by trial and error. Furthermore, puzzles consisting of several metal pieces linked together in some fashion are also considered part of this category.

The two puzzles shown in the picture are especially good for social gatherings, since they appear to be very easily taken apart, but in reality many people cannot solve this puzzle. The problem here lies in the shape of the interlocking pieces – the mating surfaces are tapered, and thus can only be removed in one direction. However, each piece has two oppositely sloping tapers mating with the two adjoining pieces so that the piece cannot be removed in either direction.

Boxes called secret boxes or puzzle boxes with secret opening mechanisms, extremely popular in Japan, are included in this category. These caskets contain more or less complex, usually invisible opening mechanisms which reveal a small hollow space on opening. There is a vast variety of opening mechanisms, such as hardly visible panels which need to be shifted, inclination mechanisms, magnetic locks, movable pins which need to be rotated into a certain position up and even time locks in which an object has to be held in a given position until a liquid has filled up a certain container.

=== Interlocking ===
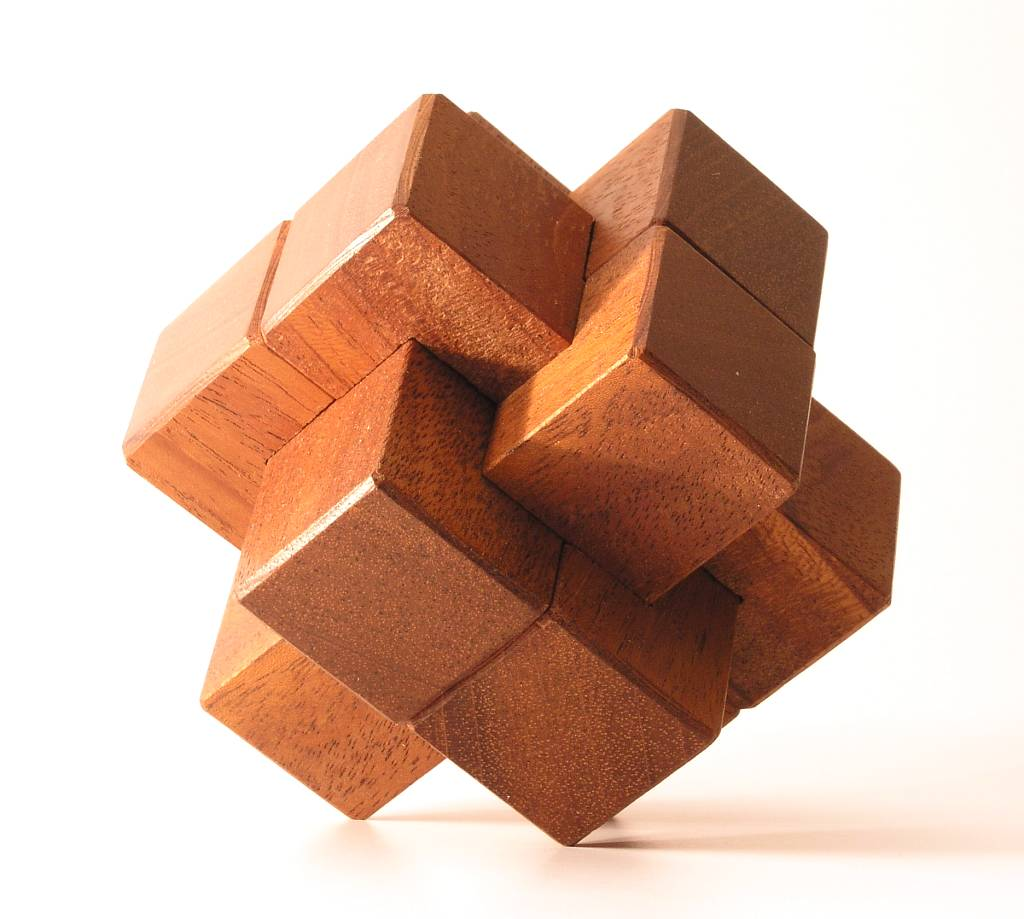
The Chinese wood knot, a notorious interlocking puzzle. In this particular version designed by Bill Cutler, five moves are needed before the first piece can be removed.

In an interlocking puzzle, one or more pieces hold the rest together, or the pieces are mutually self-sustaining. The aim is to completely disassemble and then reassemble the puzzle. Both assembly and disassembly can be difficult – contrary to assembly puzzles, these puzzles usually do not just fall apart easily. The level of difficulty is usually assessed in terms of the number of moves required to remove the first piece from the initial puzzle. Later puzzles introduced elements of rotation.

The known history of these puzzles reaches back to the beginning of the 18th century. In 1803 a catalog by "Bastelmeier" contained two puzzles of this type. Professor Hoffman's puzzle book mentioned above also contained two interlocking puzzles.

At the beginning of the 19th century the Japanese took over the market for these puzzles. They developed a multitude of games in all kinds of different shapes – animals, houses and other objects – whereas the development in the western world revolved mainly around geometrical shapes.

A Burr puzzle being disassembled

With the help of computers, it became possible to analyze complete sets of games played. This process was begun by Bill Cutler with his analysis of all the Chinese wood knots. From October 1987 to August 1990 all the 35,657,131,235 different variations were analyzed by computer. With shapes different from the Chinese cross the level of difficulty reached levels of up to 100 moves for the first piece to be removed, a scale humans would struggle to grasp. The peak of this development is a puzzle in which the addition of a few pieces doubles the number of moves. Prior to the 2003 publication of the RD Design Project by Owen, Charnley and Strickland, puzzles without right angles could not be efficiently analyzed by computers.

Stewart Coffin has been creating puzzles based upon the rhombic dodecahedron since the 1960s. These made use of strips with either six or three edges. These kinds of puzzles often have extremely irregular components, which come together in a regular shape only at the last step. Furthermore, the 60° angles allow designs in which several objects have to be moved at the same time. The "Rosebud" puzzle is a prime example of this: in this puzzle 6 pieces have to be moved from one extreme position, in which they are only touching at the corners, to the center of the completed object.

=== Disentanglement ===
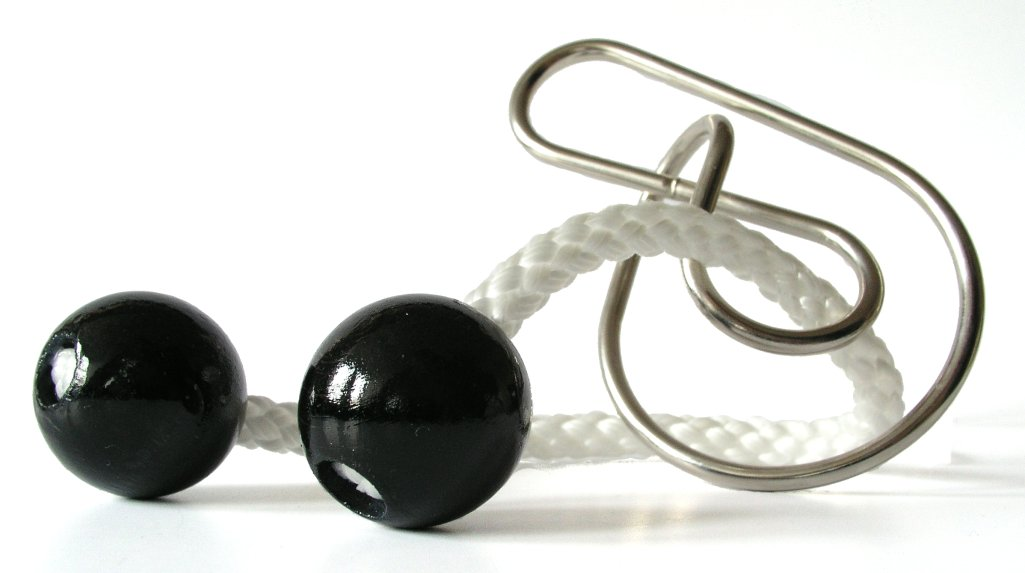
A disentanglement puzzle. The object is to remove the string with the two balls from the wire construction.

For puzzles of this kind, the goal is to disentangle a metal or string loop from an object. Topology plays an important role with these puzzles. The image shows a version of the derringer puzzle. Although simple in appearance, it is quite challenging – most puzzle sites rank it among their hardest puzzles.

Vexiers are a different sort of disentanglement puzzle – two or more metal wires, which have been intertwined, are to be untangled. They, too, spread with the general puzzle craze at the end of the 19th century. A large number of the Vexiers still available today originate in this period.

So-called ring puzzles, of which the Chinese rings are part, are a different type of Vexier. In these puzzles a long wire loop must be unsnarled from a mesh of rings and wires. The number of steps required for a solution often has an exponential relationship with the number of loops in the puzzle. The common type, which connects the rings to a bar with cords (or loose metal equivalents) has a movement pattern identical to the Gray binary code, in which only one bit changes from one code word relative to its immediate neighbor.

A noteworthy puzzle, known as the Chinese rings, Cardans' rings, the Baguenaudier or the Renaissance puzzle was mentioned in circa 1500 as Problem 107 of the manuscript De Viribus Quantitatis by Luca Pacioli. The puzzle is again referred to by Girolamo Cardano in the 1550 edition of his book De subtililate. Although the puzzle is a disentanglement-type puzzle, it also has mechanical puzzle attributes, and the solution can be derived as a binary mathematical procedure.

The Chinese rings are associated with the tale that in the Middle Ages, knights would give these to their wives as a present, so that in their absence they may fill their time. Disentanglement puzzles, made of steel, are based on forging exercises that provided good practice for blacksmith apprentices.

Niels Bohr used disentanglement puzzles called Tangloids to demonstrate the properties of spin to his students.

=== Fold ===
Fold puzzle by Vesa Timonen (2002)

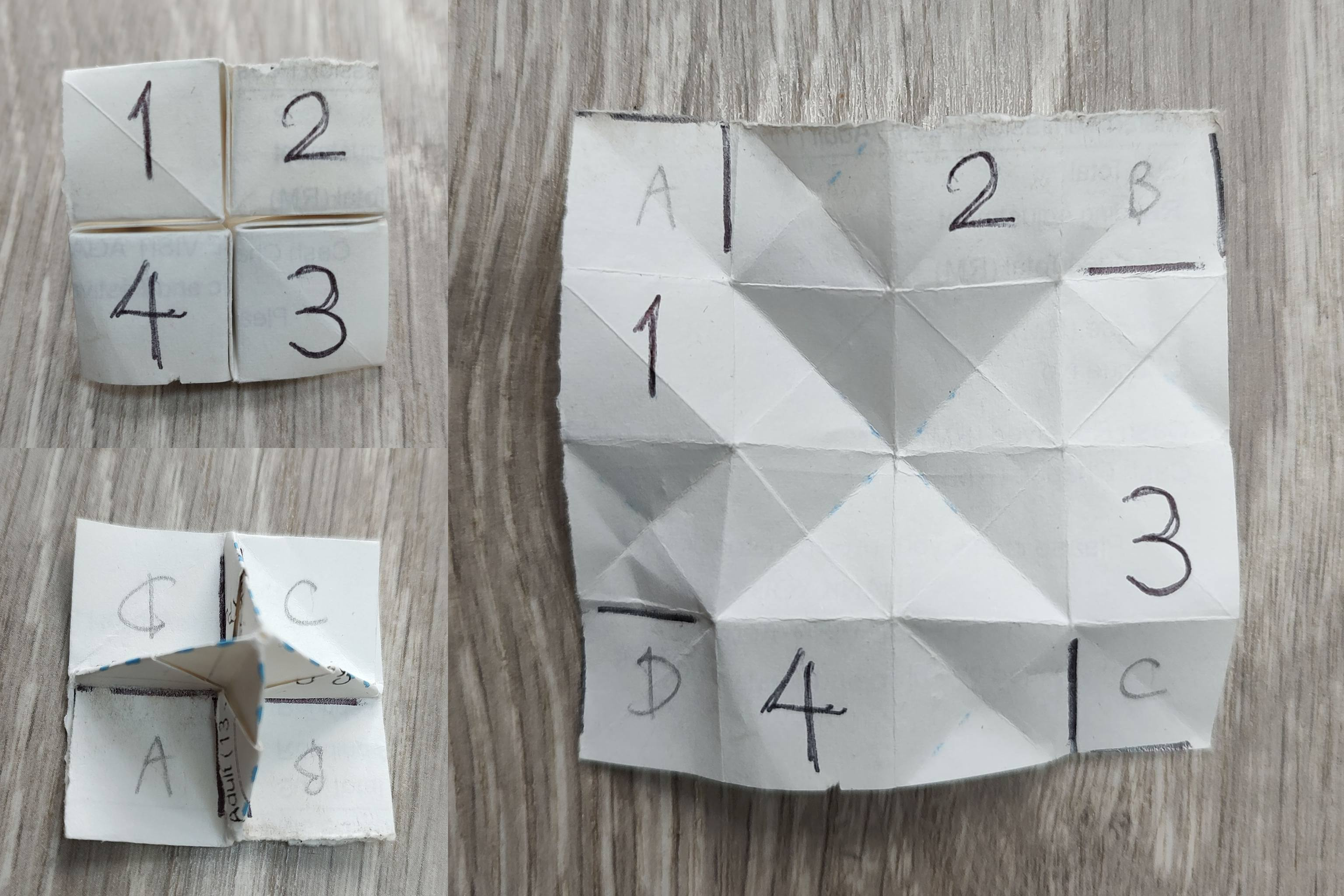
Solution with corners labelled A to D

The aim in this particular genre of puzzles is to fold a printed piece of paper in such a way as to obtain a target picture. In principle, Rubik's Magic could be counted in this category. A better example is shown in the picture. The task is to fold the square piece of paper so that the four squares with the numbers lie next to each other without any gaps and form a square.

Another folding puzzle is folding prospectuses and city maps. Despite the often visible folding direction at the folding points it can be extraordinarily difficult to put the paper back into the form with which it originally came. The reason these maps are difficult to restore to their original state is that the folds are designed for a paper-folding machine, in which the optimum folds are not of the sort an average person would try to use.

=== Lock ===
These puzzles, also called trick locks, are locks (often padlocks) which have an unusual locking mechanism. The aim is to open the lock. If you are given a key, it will not open the lock in the conventional way. For some locks it may then be more difficult to restore the original situation.

=== Trick vessels ===
Example of a trick vessel

These are vessels "with a twist". The aim is to either drink or pour from a container without spilling any of the liquid. Puzzle containers are an ancient form of game. The Greeks and Phoenicians made containers which had to be filled via an opening at the bottom. In the 9th century a number of different containers were described in detail in a Turkish book. In the 18th century the Chinese also produced these kinds of drinking containers.

One example is the puzzle jug: the neck of the container has many holes which make it possible to pour liquid into the container, but not out of it. Hidden to the puzzler's eye, there is a small tubular conduit all the way through the grip and along the upper rim of the container up to the nozzle. If one then blocks the opening at the upper end of the grip with one finger, it is possible to drink liquid from the container by sucking on the nozzle.

Other examples include the fuddling cup and the pot crown.

=== Impossible objects ===
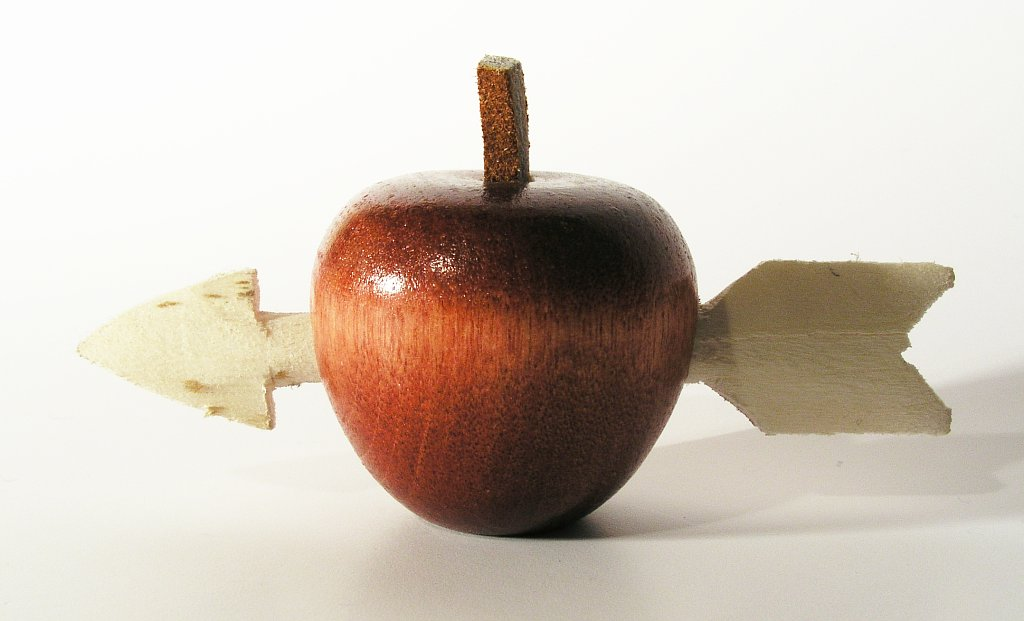
An "impossible" object

Impossible objects are objects which at first sight do not seem possible. The most well known impossible object is the ship in a bottle. The goal is to discover how these objects are made. Another well known puzzle is one consisting of a cube made of two pieces interlocked in four places by seemingly inseparable links. The solutions to these are to be found in different places. There are all kinds of objects which fit this description – "impossible bottles" which contain objects that are far too large, Japanese hole coins with wooden arrows and rings through them, wooden spheres in a wooden frame with far too small openings and many more.

The apple and arrow in the picture are made of one piece of wood each. The hole is in effect too small to fit the arrow through it and there are no signs of gluing.

=== Dexterity ===
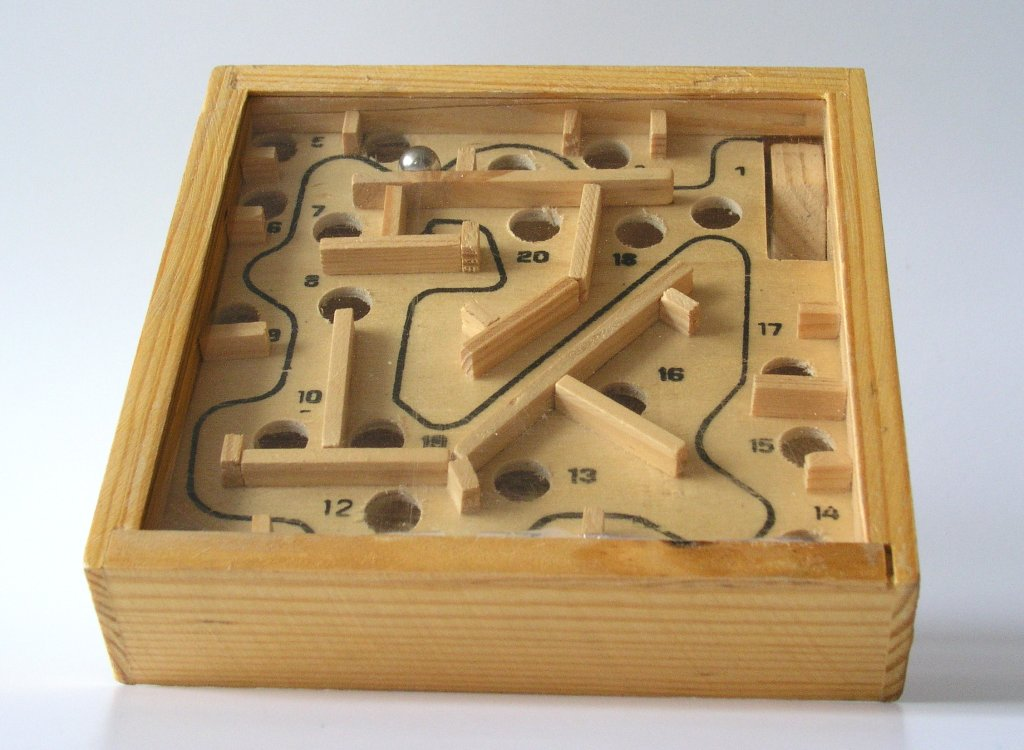
By tilting the box, one must try to lead the ball along the line and to the goal without dropping it in one of the many strategically placed holes.

The games listed in this category are not strictly puzzles as such, as dexterity and endurance are of more importance here. Often, the aim is to incline a box fitted with a transparent cover in just the right way as to cause one or more small balls to fall into holes.

=== Sequential movement ===
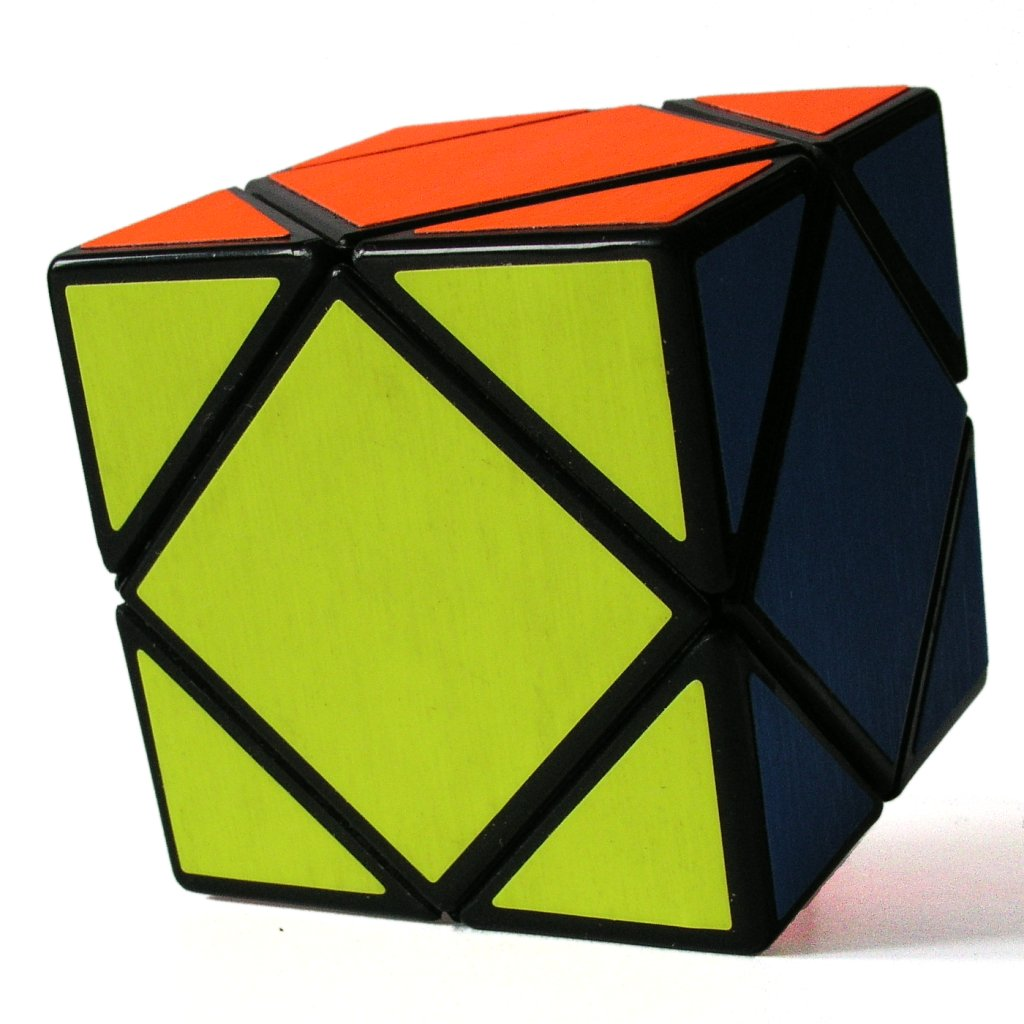
A puzzle with the name Skewb

The puzzles in this category require a repeated manipulation of the puzzle to get the puzzle to a certain target condition. Well-known puzzles of this sort are the Rubik's Cube and the Tower of Hanoi. This category also includes those puzzles in which one or more pieces have to be slid into the right position, of which the N-puzzle is the best known. Rush Hour or Sokoban are other examples.

The Rubik's Cube caused an unprecedented boom of this category. A large number of variants have been produced. Cubes of dimensions from 2×2×2 to 49×49×49 have been made, as well as many other geometric shapes such as tetrahedral and dodecahedral. With a varying orientation of the axis of rotation a variety of puzzles with the same basic shape can be created. Furthermore, one can obtain further cuboidal puzzles by removing one layer from a cube. These cuboidal puzzles take irregular shapes when they are manipulated.

The picture shows another, less well-known example of this kind of puzzle. It is just easy enough that it can still be solved with a bit of trial and error, and a few notes, as opposed to Rubik's Cube which is too difficult to just solve by trial.

A simulation of the 1960s Think-a-Dot puzzle – in the interactive SVG file, click a green arrow to drop a ball and a black arrow to reset the puzzle to either starting position

=== Simulated mechanical ===
While many computer games and computer puzzles simulate mechanical puzzles, these simulated mechanical puzzles are usually not strictly classified as mechanical puzzles.

== Other notable mechanical puzzles ==
- Chinese Ring Puzzle: Recursive iron ring manipulation (ancient)
- Nintendo Ten Billion Barrel: manipulate mechanically connected parts of a barrel
- Hedgehog in the Cage: mechanical puzzle popular in the Czech Republic

== See also ==
- Bedlam cube
- Miguel Ortiz Berrocal – produced many figurative and abstract puzzle sculptures
- Puzzle ring
