= Pentomino =

Geometric shape formed from five squares

The 12 pentominoes can form 18 different shapes, with 6 of them (the chiral pentominoes) being mirrored.

A pentomino (or 5-omino) is a polyomino of order 5; that is, a polygon in the plane made of 5 equal-sized squares connected edge to edge. The term is derived from the Greek word for '5' and "domino". When rotations and reflections are not considered to be distinct shapes, there are 12 different free pentominoes. When reflections are considered distinct, there are 18 one-sided pentominoes. When rotations are also considered distinct, there are 63 fixed pentominoes.

Pentomino tiling puzzles and games are popular in recreational mathematics. Usually, video games such as Tetris imitations and Rampart consider mirror reflections to be distinct, and thus use the full set of 18 one-sided pentominoes. (Tetris itself uses 4-square shapes called tetrominos.)

Each of the twelve pentominoes satisfies the Conway criterion; hence, every pentomino is capable of tiling the plane. Each chiral pentomino can tile the plane without being reflected.

== History ==
Comparison of labeling schemes for the 12 possible pentomino shapes. The first naming convention is the one used in this article. The second method is Conway's.

The earliest puzzle containing a complete set of pentominoes appeared in Henry Dudeney's book The Canterbury Puzzles, published in 1907. The earliest tilings of rectangles with a complete set of pentominoes appeared in the Problemist Fairy Chess Supplement in 1935, and further tiling problems were explored in the PFCS, and its successor, the Fairy Chess Review.

Pentominoes were formally defined by American professor Solomon W. Golomb starting in 1953 and later in his 1965 book Polyominoes: Puzzles, Patterns, Problems, and Packings. They were introduced to the general public by Martin Gardner in his October 1965 Mathematical Games column in Scientific American. Golomb coined the term "pentomino" from the Ancient Greek πέντε / pénte, "five", and the -omino of domino, fancifully interpreting the "d-" of "domino" as if it were a form of the Greek prefix "di-" (two). Golomb named the 12 free pentominoes after letters of the Latin alphabet that they resemble, using the mnemonic FILiPiNo along with the end of the alphabet (TUVWXYZ). Japanese master craftsman Saburo Oguro also popularized a wooden set of pentominoes based on the Chinese Zodiac symbols, which led to the wide-scale proliferation of polyomino puzzles.

John Horton Conway proposed an alternate labeling scheme for pentominoes, using O instead of I, Q instead of L, R instead of F, and S instead of N. The resemblance to the letters is more strained, especially for the O pentomino, but this scheme has the advantage of using 12 consecutive letters of the alphabet. It is used by convention in discussing Conway's Game of Life, where, for example, one speaks of the R-pentomino instead of the F-pentomino.

== Symmetry ==
- F, L, N, P, and Y can be oriented in 8 ways: 4 by rotation, and 4 more for the mirror image. Their symmetry group consists only of the identity mapping.
- T, and U can be oriented in 4 ways by rotation. They have an axis of reflection aligned with the gridlines. Their symmetry group has two elements, the identity and the reflection in a line parallel to the sides of the squares.
- V and W also can be oriented in 4 ways by rotation. They have an axis of reflection symmetry at 45° to the gridlines. Their symmetry group has two elements, the identity and a diagonal reflection.
- Z can be oriented in 4 ways: 2 by rotation, and 2 more for the mirror image. It has point symmetry, also known as rotational symmetry of order 2. Its symmetry group has two elements, the identity and the 180° rotation.
- I can be oriented in 2 ways by rotation. It has two axes of reflection symmetry, both aligned with the gridlines. Its symmetry group has four elements, the identity, two reflections and the 180° rotation. It is the dihedral group of order 2, also known as the Klein four-group.
- X can be oriented in only one way. It has four axes of reflection symmetry, aligned with the gridlines and the diagonals, and rotational symmetry of order 4. Its symmetry group, the dihedral group of order 4, has eight elements.

The F, L, N, P, Y, and Z pentominoes are chiral; adding their reflections (F′, J, N′, Q, Y′, S) brings the number of one-sided pentominoes to 18. If rotations are also considered distinct, then the pentominoes from the first category count eightfold, the ones from the next three categories (T, U, V, W, Z) count fourfold, I counts twice, and X counts only once. This results in 5×8 + 5×4 + 2 + 1 = 63 fixed pentominoes.

The eight possible orientations of the F, L, N, P, and Y pentominoes, and the four possible orientations of the T, U, V, W, and Z pentominoes are illustrated:

Eight possible orientations

F-pentomino

L-pentomino

N-pentomino

P-pentomino

Y-pentomino
Four possible orientations

T-pentomino

U-pentomino

V-pentomino

W-pentomino

Z-pentomino

For 2D figures in general there are two more categories:

- Being orientable in 2 ways by a rotation of 90°, with two axes of reflection symmetry, both aligned with the diagonals. This type of symmetry requires at least a heptomino.
- Being orientable in 2 ways, which are each other's mirror images, for example a swastika. This type of symmetry requires at least an octomino.

== Games ==
=== Tiling puzzle (2D) ===
Example tilings

A standard pentomino puzzle is to tile a rectangular box with the pentominoes, i.e. cover it without overlap and without gaps. Each of the 12 pentominoes has an area of 5 unit squares, so the box must have an area of 60 units. Possible sizes are 6×10, 5×12, 4×15 and 3×20.

The 6×10 case was first solved in 1960 by married couple Colin Brian Haselgrove and Jenifer Haselgrove. There are exactly 2,339 solutions, excluding trivial variations obtained by rotation and reflection of the whole rectangle but including rotation and reflection of a subset of pentominoes (which sometimes provides an additional solution in a simple way). The 5×12 box has 1010 solutions, the 4×15 box has 368 solutions, and the 3×20 box has just 2 solutions (one is shown in the figure, and the other one can be obtained from the solution shown by rotating, as a whole, the block consisting of the L, N, F, T, W, Y, and Z pentominoes).

A somewhat easier (more symmetrical) puzzle, the 8×8 rectangle with a 2×2 hole in the center, was solved by Dana Scott as far back as 1958. There are 65 solutions. Scott's algorithm was one of the first applications of a backtracking computer program. Variations of this puzzle allow the four holes to be placed in any position. One of the external links uses this rule.

Efficient algorithms have been described to solve such problems, for instance by Donald Knuth. Running on modern hardware, these pentomino puzzles can now be solved in mere seconds.

Unsolvable patterns

Most such patterns are solvable, with the exceptions of placing each pair of holes near two corners of the board in such a way that both corners could only be fitted by a P-pentomino, or forcing a T-pentomino or U-pentomino in a corner such that another hole is created.

The pentomino set is the only free polyomino set that can be packed into a rectangle, with the exception of the trivial monomino and domino sets, each of which consists only of a single rectangle.

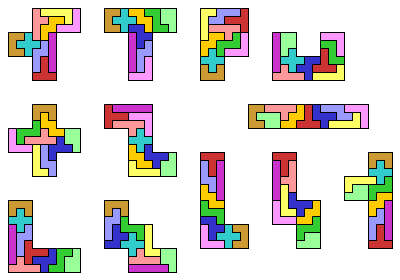
Each pentomino can be divided into nine pentominoes, as shown.

=== Box filling puzzle (3D) ===
Sample solutions to pentacube puzzles of the stated dimensions, drawn one layer at a time.

A pentacube is a polycube of five cubes. Of the 29 one-sided pentacubes, exactly twelve pentacubes are flat (1-layer) and correspond to the twelve pentominoes extruded to a depth of one square.

A pentacube puzzle or 3D pentomino puzzle, amounts to filling a 3-dimensional box with the 12 flat pentacubes, i.e. cover it without overlap and without gaps. Since each pentacube has a volume of 5 unit cubes, the box must have a volume of 60 units. Possible sizes are 2×3×10 (12 solutions), 2×5×6 (264 solutions) and 3×4×5 (3940 solutions).

Alternatively one could also consider combinations of five cubes that are themselves 3D, i.e., those which include more than just the 12 "flat" single-layer thick combinations of cubes. However, in addition to the 12 "flat" pentacubes formed by extruding the pentominoes, there are 6 sets of chiral pairs and 5 additional pieces, forming a total of 29 potential pentacube pieces, which gives 145 cubes in total (=29×5); as 145 can only be packed into a box measuring 29×5×1, it cannot be formed by including the non-flat pentominoes.

=== Commercial board games ===
There are board games of skill based entirely on pentominoes. Such games are often simply called "Pentominoes".

One of the games is played on an 8×8 grid by two or three players. Players take turns in placing pentominoes on the board so that they do not overlap with existing tiles and no tile is used more than once. The objective is to be the last player to place a tile on the board. This version of Pentominoes is called "Golomb's Game".

The two-player version has been weakly solved in 1996 by Hilarie Orman. It was proved to be a first-player win by examining around 22 billion board positions.

Pentominoes, and similar shapes, are also the basis of a number of other tiling games, patterns and puzzles. For example, the French board game Blokus is played with 4 colored sets of polyominoes, each consisting of every pentomino (12), tetromino (5), triomino (2) domino (1) and monomino (1). Like the game Pentominoes, the goal is to use all of your tiles, and a bonus is given if the monomino is played on the last move. The player with the fewest blocks remaining wins.

The game of Cathedral is also based on polyominoes.

Parker Brothers released a multi-player pentomino board game called Universe in 1966. Its theme is based on a deleted scene from the 1968 film 2001: A Space Odyssey in which an astronaut is playing a two-player pentomino game against the HAL 9000 computer (a scene with a different astronaut playing chess was retained). The front of the board game box features scenes from the movie as well as a caption describing it as the "game of the future". The game comes with four sets of pentominoes in red, yellow, blue, and white. The board has two playable areas: a base 10x10 area for two players with an additional 25 squares (two more rows of 10 and one offset row of five) on each side for more than two players.

Game manufacturer Lonpos has a number of games that use the same pentominoes, but on different game planes. Their 101 Game has a 5 x 11 plane. By changing the shape of the plane, thousands of puzzles can be played, although only a relatively small selection of these puzzles are available in print.

=== Video games ===
- Tetris was inspired by pentomino puzzles, though it uses four-block tetrominoes. Some Tetris clones and variants, like the game 5s included with Plan 9 from Bell Labs, or Magical Tetris Challenge, among others, use pentominoes in some of their game modes, which are often referred to as Pentix. There are some unofficial variants such as TETR.IO and Jstris that have pentomino modes, usually as April Fools' jokes due to the difficulty spike in gameplay.
- Daedalian Opus uses pentomino puzzles throughout the game.

== Literature ==
Pentominoes were featured in a prominent subplot of Arthur C. Clarke's 1975 novel Imperial Earth. Clarke also wrote an essay in which he described the game and how he got hooked on it.

They were also featured in Blue Balliett's Chasing Vermeer, which was published in 2003 and illustrated by Brett Helquist, as well as its sequels, The Wright 3 and The Calder Game.

In The New York Times crossword puzzle for June 27, 2012, the clue for an 11-letter word at 37 across was "Complete set of 12 shapes formed by this puzzle's black squares."

== See also ==
=== Previous and next orders ===
- Tetromino
- Hexomino

=== Others ===
- Tiling puzzle
- Cathedral board game
- Solomon W. Golomb
