= Blokus =

Abstract strategy board game whose pieces are polyominoes

- Designers: Bernard Tavitian
- Publishers: Mattel
- Publication: 2000; 26 years ago
- Players: 2–4
- Setup time: < 1 minute
- Playing time: 20–30 minutes
- Chance: None
- Skills: Strategic thought

Related games
- Quads, Gemblo, Go, Patchwork

Blokus (/ˈblɒkəs/ BLOK-əs) is an abstract strategy board game for two to four players, where players try to score points by occupying most of the board with pieces of their color. The board is a square regular grid and the pieces are polyominoes. Blokus was designed by the French biophysicist Bernard Tavitian and first released in 2000 by Sekkoïa, a French company.

Blokus was the 2003 Australian Games Association Game of the Year, and won several other awards, including the 2002 Japan Boardgame Prize for the Best Japanese Game (i.e., published in Japanese package and sold in Japan), the 2003 Mensa Select Award, the 2004 Major Fun Award, and the 2004 Teacher's Choice Award. In 2008, the game was sold to Mattel. Blokus has many board and video game spinoffs.

== Gameplay ==
The shapes and values of the 21 Blokus tiles

The game is played on a square board divided into 20 rows and 20 columns, for a total of 400 squares. There are a total of 84 game tiles, organized into 21 shapes in each of the four colors: blue, yellow, red, and green. The shapes are the 21 possible free polyominoes of one to five squares (one monomino, one domino, two trominoes/triominoes, five tetrominoes, and 12 pentominoes), which total to 89 squares per player. The numbers of these shapes are the first in the A000105 sequence.

The standard rules of play for all variations of the game are as follows:

- Order of play is based on the color of pieces: blue, yellow, red, green.
- The first piece played of each color is placed in one of the board's four corners. Each new piece played must be placed so that it touches at least one piece of the same color by at least one corner — only corner-to-corner contact is allowed between pieces of the same color. On the other hand, there are no restrictions on how pieces of different colors touch each other.
- When a player cannot place a piece, they cannot play until the end of the game, and play continues for the other players. The game ends when no one can place any more pieces.

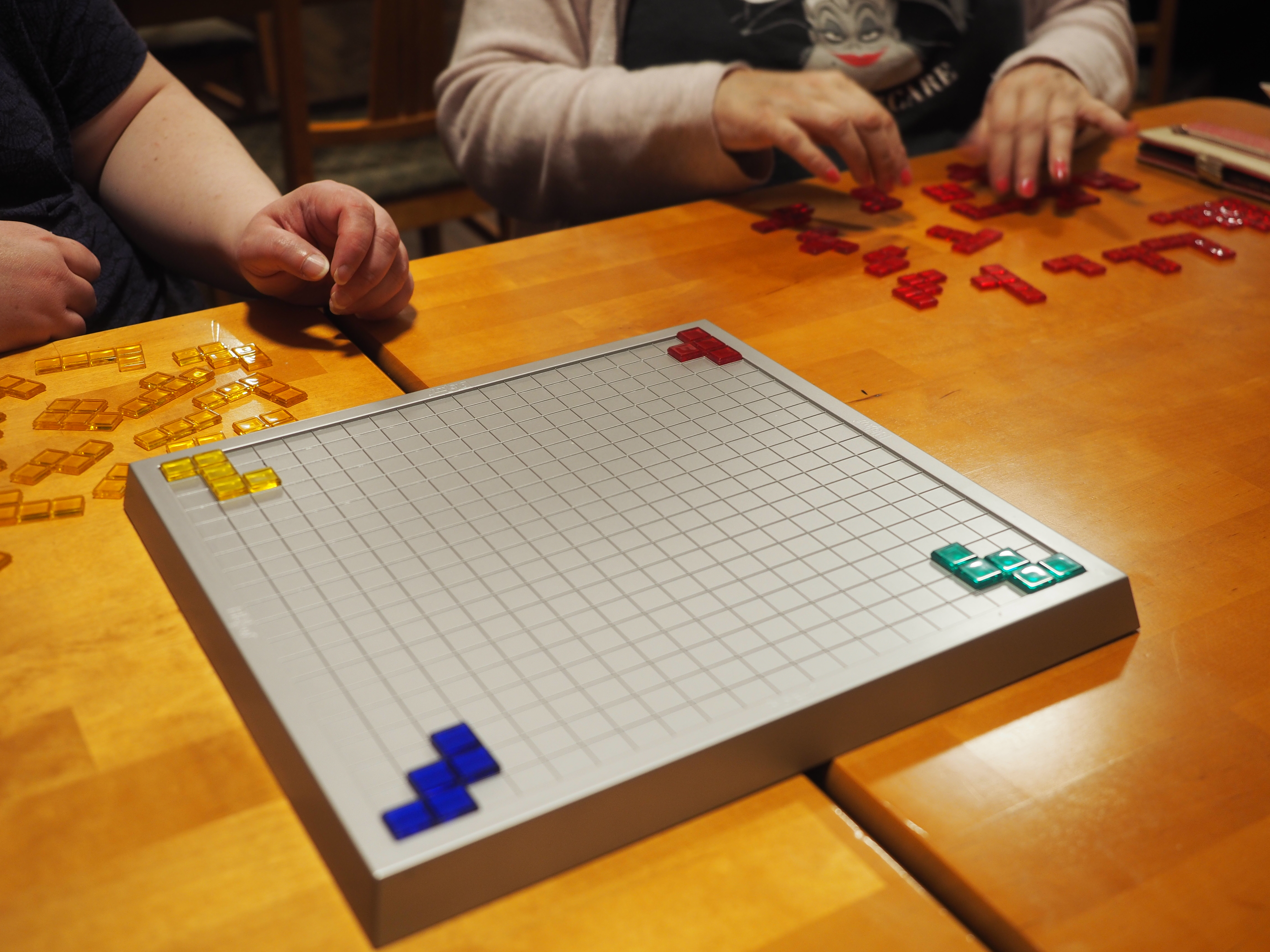
In the standard/original four-player version, each player's first piece must touch one of the board's four corners, as shown.

Once the game ends, each player counts every square of the piece(s) that they did not place on the board, each counting as a negative (−1) point (e.g., an unplayed tetromino is worth −4 points). A player who played all their pieces is awarded a 15-point bonus. If their last piece played was their monomino, provided that all their pieces have been played, the player is awarded an additional 5-point bonus. The player with the highest score wins.

== Two- and three-player variations ==
Blokus rules also allow for two- and three-player games. In two-player games, each player takes two colors. In three-player games, either one of the players takes two colors or else "the pieces of the fourth color are placed on the board in a non-strategic way".

== Variations and spinoffs ==
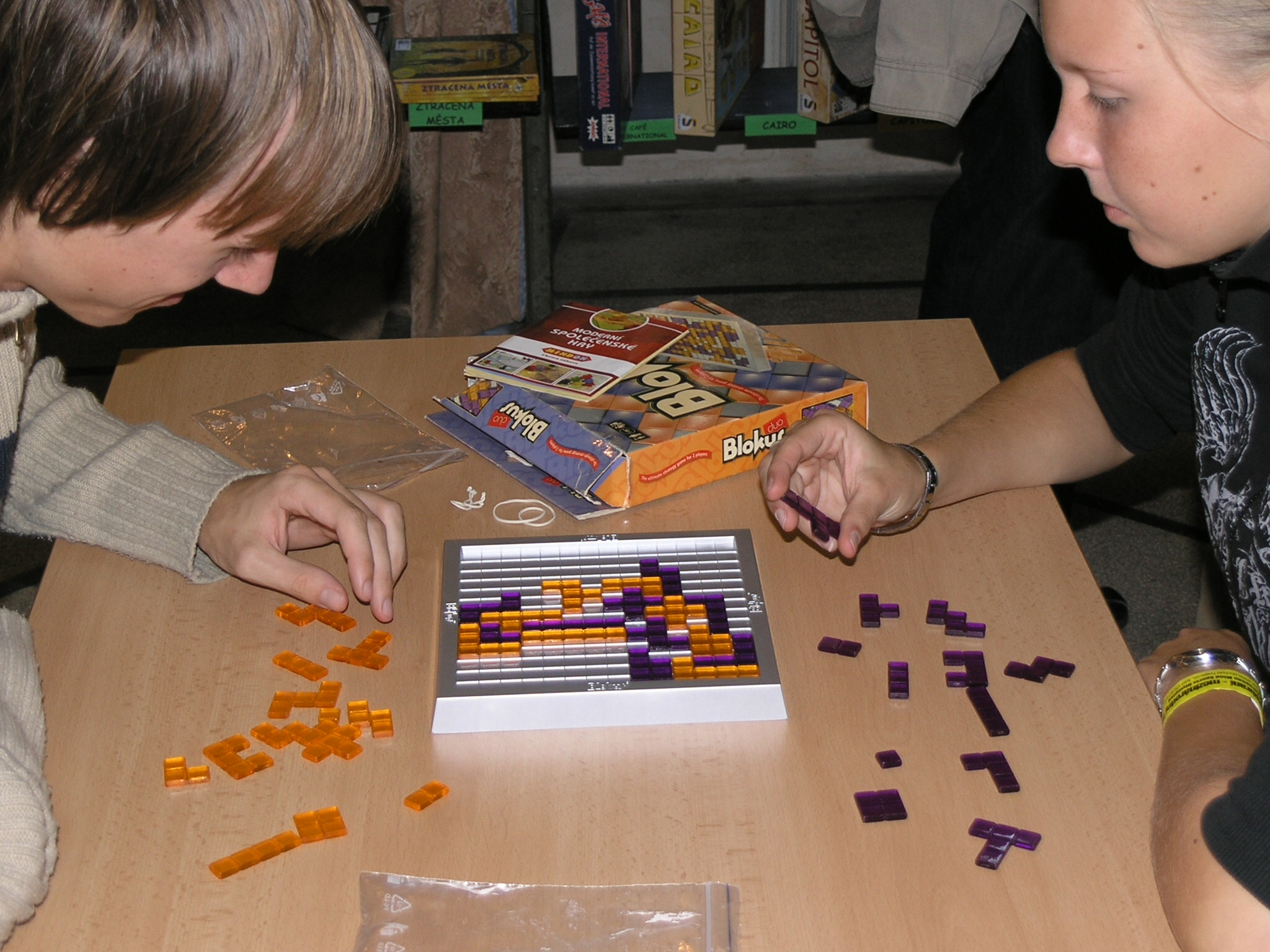
Blokus Duo (in its original iteration: with purple and orange pieces)

Sekkoïa and its distributors manufacture four additional variants of the game.

=== Blokus Duo ===
Blokus Duo is for two players only, and uses a smaller board (14 × 14); the pieces are opaque with black and white colors (originally translucent with purple and orange colors). The two starting squares are not placed in corners (as in the original Blokus game), but nearer the centre. This makes a crucial difference in the flavour of the game, because players' pieces may (and usually do) touch after the first "move". Even more than the original game, Blokus Duo is an offense-centred game; it is also considered a purer strategy game than the four-player version, since one can't be targeted by two or more players at once.

Blokus Duo was among the five nominees for the 2006 International Gamers Award, General Strategy, 2-Player Category, and has won a Sceau d'excellence Option consommateurs (Protégez-vous) 2006 — "2006 Consumers Option (Protect Yourself) Seal of Excellence".

=== Blokus Trigon ===
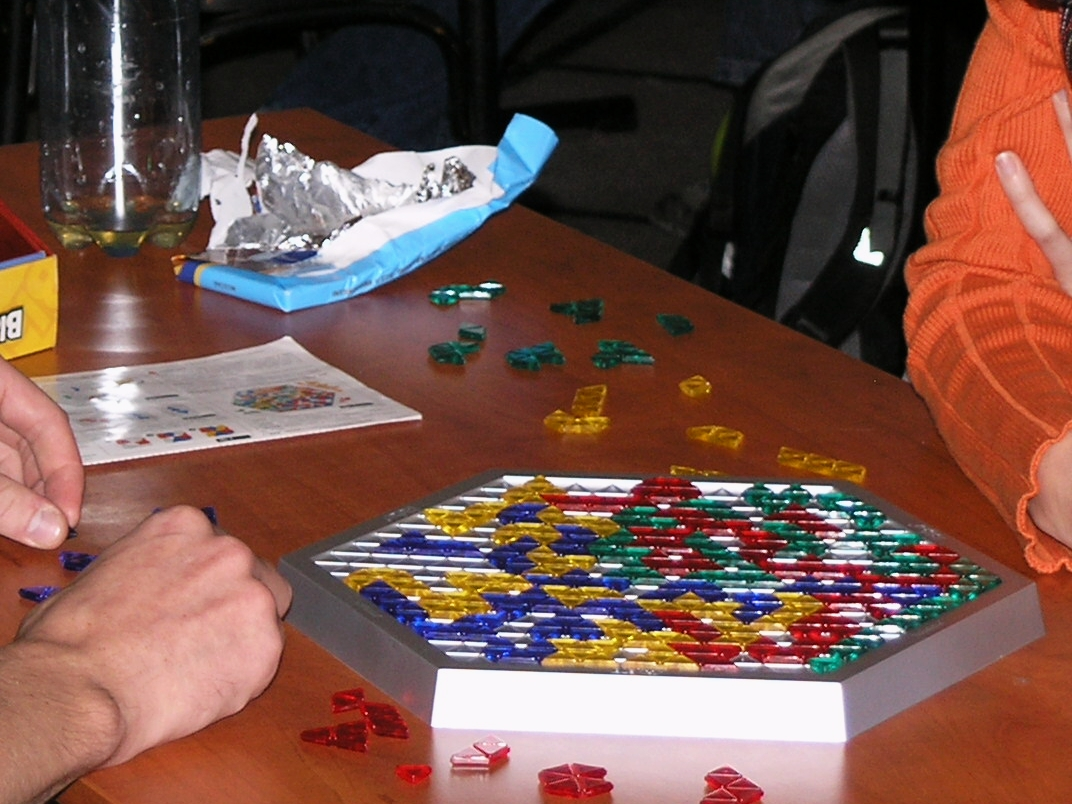
Blokus Trigon

In Blokus Trigon, the pieces are polyiamonds: made up of equilateral triangles, and the board is hexagonal with a regular triangular grid. This particular spinoff is optimized for three players but can be played by two to four players. The same rules apply, meaning that pieces of the same color are still not allowed to touch each other's edges; however, since the grid is isometric, a corner touching an edge is allowed.

Blokus Trigon has won the 2006 Major Fun Award.

=== Blokus Giant/XL ===
Blokus Giant is a larger version, with the game board being about 570 mm (22 in) square. It was later re-released by Mattel as Blokus XL.

=== Blokus Junior ===
Blokus Junior is targeted at younger children. Like Blokus Duo, it is played by two players on a 14 × 14 board, but it uses only a subset of the pieces that have simpler shapes. There are 12 unique pieces. Each player gets two of each kind, 24 in total. The game also comes with a set of single-player puzzle sheets, each containing a preset piece position on the board and a set of pieces to place into the board following standard Blokus rules.

=== Travel Blokus/Blokus To Go! ===
Travel Blokus was released as the smaller version of Blokus Duo, then re-released as Blokus To Go! with pieces that could be snapped into the board for storage. Travel Blokus was later re-released as the smaller version of the original Blokus game, rather than Blokus Duo.

=== Blokus 3D ===
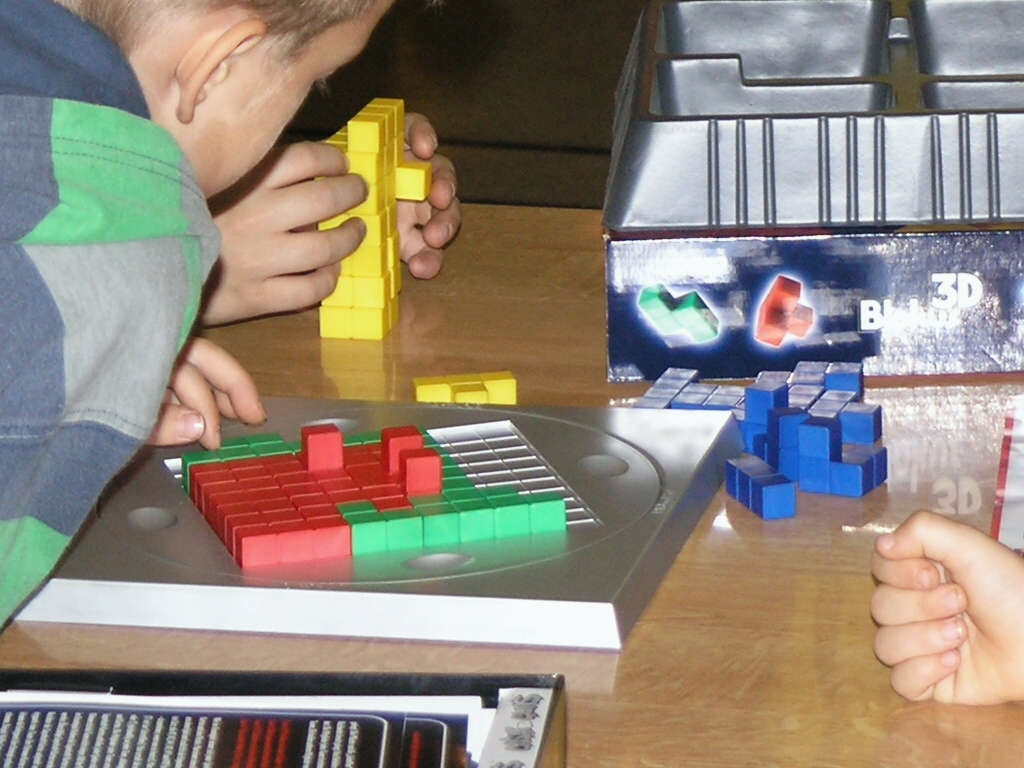
Blokus 3D

Blokus 3D was originally marketed in a Mayan theme as Rumis, created by Stefan Kögl, independently from Bernard Tavitian. However, Rumis was rebranded into Blokus 3D because the Blokus brand proved stronger than Rumis.

In Blokus 3D, exactly like in Rumis, but unlike in Blokus "2D":

- The pieces are four times the eleven possible polycubes of two, three, and four (unit) cubes.
- A piece must be placed such that it touches another piece of the same color by at least one unit square, instead of corner. Also, a piece cannot be placed such that it creates any empty space underneath any part of it.
- Together, the players build (almost) one of four different ideal structures: the Tower, Wall, Steps, and Pyramid. Each structure has its own placement limitations.
- Each player aims at having as many unit squares of their color on the top of the stack and placing as many of their pieces as possible. At the end of the game, the player with the most squares from the top view and the least remaining pieces wins.

Blokus 3D has won the 2008 Japan Boardgame Prize U-more Award.

== Video games ==
There have been video games based on Blokus. Irem was the first to develop such a kind of video game, in the form of what is known as Blokus Club with Bumpy Trot. Released in Japan in 2005 for the PlayStation 2, and one year later for the PlayStation Portable, the game features characters from Steambot Chronicles (Bumpy Trot in Japan) playing the Classic, Travel, and Duo versions of the game. The game received an international release in 2008, under the name Blokus Portable: Steambot Championship.

Funkitron developed a PC casual game version of Blokus called Blokus World Tour. Released in December 2007, Blokus World Tour was similar to the board game version of Blokus but also featured 16 AI opponents, music and sound effects, and multiple game modes, including a tour mode, quick play, and a challenge series.

For some time, there was an official online version of Blokus where players all over the world could play the four official variations of Blokus. Mattel discontinued the online game on May 18, 2012, claiming it did not meet its playability standards.

Gameloft developed and released an official Blokus video game for iPhone, iPod Touch, and iPad in April 2010, featuring the Classic and Duo versions of the game, local and online multiplayer gameplay, and single player tournament mode. The Gameloft version was also released as a digital download game for the PlayStation 3 in December 2010, and a J2ME version in that same year. All editions of the Gameloft Blokus game were discontinued in January 2014, minus the J2ME version which is still downloadable online.

The most recent officially licensed Blokus app was developed by Magmic, and was available for iPhone, iPod Touch, and iPad. This version included solo play and multiplayer options, integrating the users' Facebook and Game Center friends and allowing them to compete on a tournament leaderboard. The Magmic Blokus game was delisted from the App Store in December 2018.

== Reviews ==
- Family Games: The 100 Best

== See also ==
- Domino
- Four color theorem
- Pentomino
- Polyomino
- Pseudo-polyomino
- Tetromino
- Tromino
- Tetris
