= Tetromino =

Four squares connected edge-to-edge

The five free tetrominoes.

A tetromino is a geometric shape composed of four squares, connected orthogonally (i.e. at the edges and not the corners). Tetrominoes, like dominoes and pentominoes, are a particular type of polyomino. The corresponding polycube, called a tetracube, is a geometric shape composed of four cubes connected orthogonally.

A popular use of tetrominoes is in the video game Tetris created by the Soviet game designer Alexey Pajitnov, which refers to them as tetriminos. The tetrominoes used in the game are specifically the one-sided tetrominoes.

== Etymology ==
The name "tetromino" is a combination of the prefix tetra- 'four' (from Ancient Greek τετρα-), and "domino". The name was introduced by Solomon W. Golomb in 1953 along with other nomenclature related to polyominos.

== Types of tetrominoes ==
=== Free tetrominoes ===
Polyominos are formed by joining unit squares along their edges. A free polyomino is a polyomino considered up to congruence. That is, two free polyominos are the same if there is a combination of translations, rotations, and reflections that turns one into the other. A free tetromino is a free polyomino made from four squares. There are five free tetrominoes.

The free tetrominoes have the following symmetry:

- Straight: vertical and horizontal reflection symmetry, and two-fold rotational symmetry
- Square: vertical, horizontal, and diagonal reflection symmetry, and four-fold rotational symmetry
- T: vertical reflection symmetry only
- L: no symmetry
- S: two-fold rotational symmetry only

"straight tetromino"

"square tetromino"

"T-tetromino"

"L-tetromino"

"skew tetromino"

=== One-sided tetrominoes ===
One-sided tetrominoes are tetrominoes that may be translated and rotated but not reflected. They are used by, and are overwhelmingly associated with, Tetris. There are seven distinct one-sided tetrominoes. These tetrominoes are named by the letter of the alphabet they most closely resemble. The "I", "O", and "T" tetrominoes have reflectional symmetry, so it does not matter whether they are considered as free tetrominoes or one-sided tetrominoes. The remaining four tetrominoes, "J", "L", "S", and "Z", exhibit chirality. J and L are reflections of each other, and S and Z are reflections of each other.

As free tetrominoes, J is equivalent to L, and S is equivalent to Z, but in two dimensions and without reflections, it is not possible to transform J into L or S into Z.

I

O

T

J

L

S

Z

=== Fixed tetrominoes ===
The fixed tetrominoes allow only translation, not rotation nor reflection. There are two distinct fixed I-tetrominoes, four J, four L, one O, two S, four T, and two Z, for a total of 19 fixed tetrominoes.

== Filling a rectangle ==
=== Filling a rectangle with one set of tetrominoes ===
A single set of free tetrominoes or one-sided tetrominoes cannot fit in a rectangle. This can be shown with a proof similar to the mutilated chessboard argument. A 5×4 rectangle with a checkerboard pattern has 20 squares, containing 10 light squares and 10 dark squares, but a complete set of free tetrominoes has either 11 dark squares and 9 light squares, or 11 light squares and 9 dark squares. This is due to the T tetromino having either 3 dark squares and one light square, or 3 light squares and one dark square, while all other tetrominoes each have 2 dark squares and 2 light squares. Similarly, a 7×4 rectangle has 28 squares, containing 14 squares of each shade, but the set of one-sided tetrominoes has either 15 dark squares and 13 light squares, or 15 light squares and 13 dark squares. By extension, any odd number of sets for either type cannot fit in a rectangle. Additionally, the 19 fixed tetrominoes cannot fit in a 4×19 rectangle. This was discovered by exhausting all possibilities in a computer search.

The free tetrominoes (left side of line) have 11 dark squares and 9 light squares.
The one-sided tetrominoes (all 7 shown above) have 15 dark squares and 13 light squares.

A 5×4 board has 10 squares each color.
A 7×4 board has 14 squares each color.

=== Parity ===
A further consequence of the T tetromino having 3 squares of one colour and 1 square of the other is that any rectangle containing an even number of squares must contain an even number of T tetrominoes. Conversely, any rectangles containing an odd number of squares must contain an odd number of T tetrominoes.

=== Filling a modified rectangle with one set of tetrominoes ===
All three sets of tetrominoes can fit rectangles with holes:

- All 5 free tetrominoes fit a 7×3 rectangle with a hole.
- All 7 one-sided tetrominoes fit a 6×5 rectangle with two holes of the same "checkerboard color".
- All 19 fixed tetrominoes fit a 11×7 rectangle with a hole.

Free tetrominoes in a rectangle with one hole

One-sided tetrominoes in a rectangle with two holes

Fixed tetrominoes in rectangle with one hole

=== Filling a rectangle with two sets of tetrominoes ===
Two sets of free or one-sided tetrominoes can fit into a rectangle in different ways, as shown below:

Two sets of free tetrominoes in a 5×8 rectangle

Two sets of free tetrominoes in a 4×10 rectangle

Two sets of one-sided tetrominoes in a 8×7 rectangle

Two sets of one-sided tetrominoes in a 14×4 rectangle

== Filling a box with tetracubes ==
Each of the five free tetrominoes has a corresponding tetracube, which is the tetromino extruded by one unit. J and L are the same tetracube, as are S and Z, because one may be rotated around an axis parallel to the tetromino's plane to form the other. Three more tetracubes are possible, all created by placing a unit cube on the bent tricube:

I
"straight tetracube"

O
"square tetracube"

T
"T-tetracube"

L
"L-tetracube"

J is the same as L in 3D

S
"skew tetracube"

Z is the same as S in 3D

B
"Branch"

D
"Right Screw"

F
"Left Screw"

The tetracubes can be packed into two-layer 3D boxes in several different ways, based on the dimensions of the box and criteria for inclusion. They are shown in both a pictorial diagram and a text diagram. For boxes using two sets of the same pieces, the pictorial diagram depicts each set as a lighter or darker shade of the same color. The text diagram depicts each set as having a capital or lower-case letter. In the text diagram, the top layer is on the left, and the bottom layer is on the right.

1.) 2×4×5 box filled with two sets of free tetrominoes: 

Z Z T t I        l T T T i
L Z Z t I        l l l t i
L z z t I        o o z z i
L L O O I        o o O O i





2.) 2×2×10 box filled with two sets of free tetrominoes:

L L L z z Z Z T O O        o o z z Z Z T T T l
L I I I I t t t O O        o o i i i i t l l l





3.) 2×4×4 box filled with one set of all tetrominoes:

F T T T        F Z Z B
F F T B        Z Z B B
O O L D        L L L D
O O D D        I I I I





4.) 2×2×8 box filled with one set of all tetrominoes: 

D Z Z L O T T T        D L L L O B F F
D D Z Z O B T F        I I I I O B B F





5.) 2×2×7 box filled with tetrominoes, with mirror-image pieces removed:

L L L Z Z B B        L C O O Z Z B
C I I I I T B        C C O O T T T

== See also ==
- LITS
- Soma cube

=== Previous and next orders ===
- Tromino
- Pentomino
