= Tromino =

Geometric shape formed from three squares

All possible free trominos

A tromino or triomino is a polyomino of size 3, that is, a polygon in the plane made of three equal-sized squares connected edge-to-edge.

== Symmetry and enumeration ==
When rotations and reflections are not considered to be distinct shapes, there are only two different free trominoes: "I" and "L" (the "L" shape is also called "V").

Since both free trominoes have reflection symmetry, they are also the only two one-sided trominoes (trominoes with reflections considered distinct). When rotations are also considered distinct, there are six fixed trominoes: two I and four L shapes. They can be obtained by rotating the above forms by 90°, 180° and 270°.

== Rep-tiling and Golomb's tromino theorem ==
Geometrical dissection of an L-tromino (rep-4)

Both types of tromino can be dissected into n^{2} smaller trominos of the same type, for any integer n > 1. That is, they are rep-tiles. Continuing this dissection recursively leads to a tiling of the plane, which in many cases is an aperiodic tiling. In this context, the L-tromino is called a chair, and its tiling by recursive subdivision into four smaller L-trominos is called the chair tiling.

Motivated by the mutilated chessboard problem, Solomon W. Golomb used this tiling as the basis for what has become known as Golomb's tromino theorem: if any square is removed from a 2^{n} × 2^{n} chessboard, the remaining board can be completely covered with L-trominoes. To prove this by mathematical induction, partition the board into a quarter-board of size 2^{n−1} × 2^{n−1} that contains the removed square, and a large tromino formed by the other three quarter-boards. The tromino can be recursively dissected into unit trominoes, and a dissection of the quarter-board with one square removed follows by the induction hypothesis. In contrast, when a chessboard of this size has one square removed, it is not always possible to cover the remaining squares by I-trominoes.

== See also ==
=== Previous and next orders ===
- Domino
- Tetromino
