= Hoffman's packing puzzle =

Assembly puzzle named after Dean Hoffman

A solution to Hoffman's packing puzzle with 4×5×6 cuboids coloured by orientation (1), and exploded to show each layer (2). In the SVG file, hover over the cuboids for their dimensions.

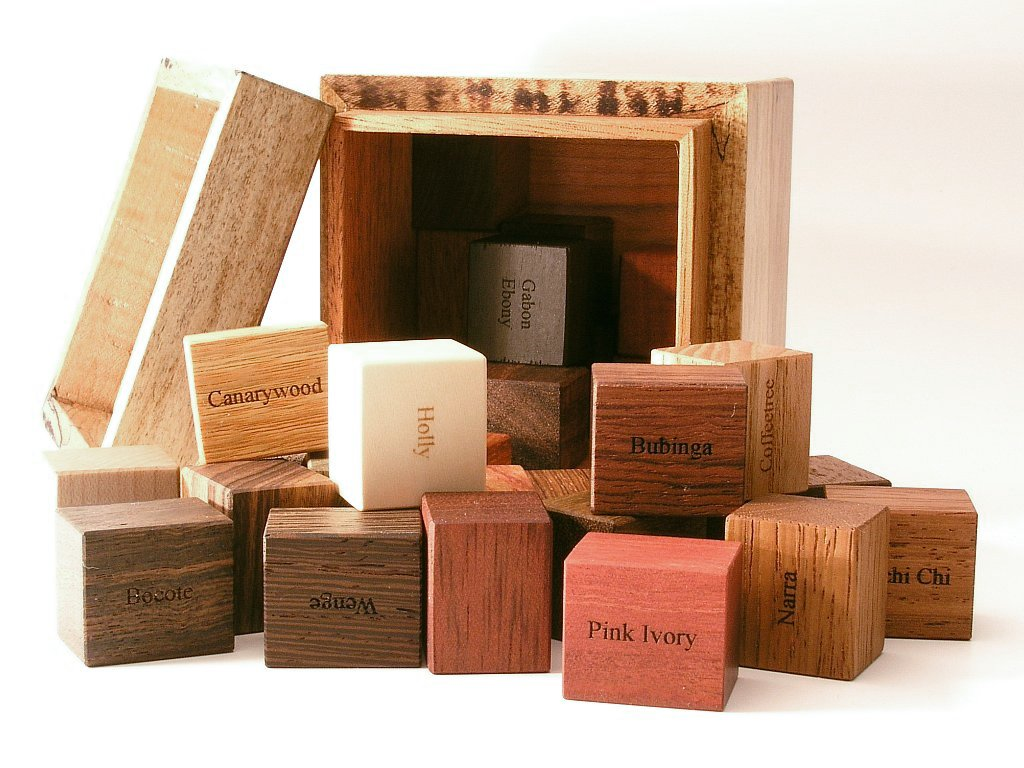
Hoffman's packing puzzle, disassembled

Hoffman's packing puzzle is an assembly puzzle named after Dean G. Hoffman, who described it in 1978. The puzzle consists of 27 identical rectangular cuboids, each of whose edges have three different lengths. Its goal is to assemble them all to fit within a cube whose edge length is the sum of the three lengths.

Hoffman (1981) writes that the first person to solve the puzzle was David A. Klarner, and that typical solution times can range from 20 minutes to multiple hours.

== Construction ==
The puzzle itself consists only of 27 identical rectangular cuboid-shaped blocks, although physical realizations of the puzzle also typically supply a cubical box to fit the blocks into. If the three lengths of the block edges are x, y, and z, then the cube should have edge length x + y + z. Although the puzzle can be constructed with any three different edge lengths, it is most difficult when the three edge lengths of the blocks are close enough together that x + y + z < 4 min(x,y,z), as this prevents alternative solutions in which four blocks of the minimum width are packed next to each other. Additionally, having the three lengths form an arithmetic progression can make it more confusing, because in this case placing three blocks of the middle width next to each other produces a row of the correct total width but one that cannot lead to a valid solution to the whole puzzle.

== Mathematical analysis ==
Each valid solution to the puzzle arranges the blocks in an approximate 3 × 3 × 3 grid of blocks, with the sides of the blocks all parallel to the sides of the outer cube, and with one block of each width along each axis-parallel line of three blocks. Counting reflections and rotations as being the same solution as each other, the puzzle has 21 combinatorially distinct solutions.

The total volume of the pieces, 27xyz, is less than the volume (x + y + z)^{3} of the cube that they pack into. If one takes the cube root of both volumes, and divides by three, then the number obtained in this way from the total volume of the pieces is the geometric mean of x, y, and z, while the number obtained in the same way from the volume of the cube is their arithmetic mean. The fact that the pieces have less total volume than the cube follows from the inequality of arithmetic and geometric means.

== Table of solutions ==
The 21 distinct solutions are tabulated here as described by the references cited above.

All boxes below are entered in the format (north-south length) x (east-west length) x (up-down length), denoting the size of each box with the dimensions A, B, and C, where A < B < C. (In the above example, A = 4, B = 5, and C = 6).

All 3x3 matrices describe a set of 9 boxes, with east-west neighbors along each row and north-south neighbors down each column, with the three stacked layers being listed in sequence for each solution.

Solution	Bottom layer	Middle layer	Top layer
Solution 01	CxBxA AxCxB BxAxC; BxCxA CxAxB AxBxC; AxCxB BxAxC CxBxA	CxAxB AxBxC BxCxA; AxBxC BxAxC AxCxB; BxCxA CxBxA CxAxB	BxAxC CxBxA AxCxB; CxAxB BxCxA CxBxA; AxBxC AxCxB BxAxC
Solution 02	CxBxA AxCxB BxAxC; BxCxA CxAxB AxBxC; AxCxB BxAxC CxBxA	CxAxB AxBxC AxCxB; AxBxC BxAxC BxCxA; BxCxA CxBxA CxAxB	BxAxC BxCxA CxBxA; CxAxB CxBxA AxCxB; AxBxC AxCxB BxAxC
Solution 03	CxBxA AxCxB BxAxC; BxCxA CxAxB AxBxC; AxCxB BxAxC CxBxA	AxBxC BxAxC BxCxA; CxAxB AxBxC AxCxB; BxCxA CxBxA CxAxB	CxAxB CxBxA AxCxB; BxAxC BxCxA CxBxA; AxBxC AxCxB BxAxC
Solution 04	CxBxA AxCxB BxAxC; BxCxA CxAxB AxBxC; AxCxB BxAxC CxBxA	AxBxC BxAxC AxCxB; CxAxB AxBxC BxCxA; BxCxA CxBxA CxAxB	CxAxB BxCxA CxBxA; BxAxC CxBxA AxCxB; AxBxC AxCxB BxAxC
Solution 05	CxBxA AxCxB CxAxB; BxCxA CxBxA BxAxC; AxCxB BxAxC AxBxC	AxBxC BxCxA BxAxC; BxAxC AxCxB CxBxA; CxBxA CxAxB AxCxB	AxCxB BxAxC CxBxA; CxAxB AxBxC AxCxB; BxAxC CxBxA BxCxA
Solution 06	CxBxA AxCxB CxAxB; BxCxA CxBxA BxAxC; AxCxB BxAxC AxBxC	AxBxC BxCxA BxAxC; CxAxB AxCxB CxBxA; BxAxC CxBxA AxCxB	AxCxB BxAxC CxBxA; BxAxC AxBxC AxCxB; CxBxA CxAxB BxCxA
Solution 07	CxBxA AxCxB BxAxC; BxCxA CxBxA CxAxB; AxCxB BxAxC AxBxC	CxAxB CxBxA BxCxA; BxAxC AxCxB AxBxC; AxBxC BxCxA CxAxB	AxBxC BxAxC AxCxB; CxAxB AxBxC BxCxA; BxCxA CxAxB CxBxA
Solution 08	CxBxA AxCxB BxAxC; BxCxA CxBxA CxAxB; AxCxB BxAxC AxBxC	BxAxC CxBxA BxCxA; CxAxB AxCxB AxBxC; AxBxC BxCxA CxAxB	CxAxB AxBxC AxCxB; AxBxC BxAxC BxCxA; BxCxA CxAxB CxBxA
Solution 09	CxBxA AxCxB BxAxC; BxCxA CxBxA CxAxB; AxCxB BxAxC AxBxC	AxBxC BxCxA CxAxB; BxAxC AxCxB AxBxC; CxBxA CxAxB BxCxA	AxCxB BxAxC CxBxA; CxAxB AxBxC BxCxA; BxAxC CxBxA AxCxB
Solution 10	CxBxA AxCxB BxAxC; BxCxA CxBxA CxAxB; AxCxB BxAxC AxBxC	AxBxC BxCxA CxAxB; CxAxB AxCxB AxBxC; BxAxC CxBxA BxCxA	AxCxB BxAxC CxBxA; BxAxC AxBxC BxCxA; CxBxA CxAxB AxCxB
Solution 11	CxBxA AxCxB BxAxC; BxCxA BxAxC AxBxC; AxCxB CxBxA CxAxB	CxAxB AxBxC BxCxA; AxBxC CxAxB AxCxB; BxCxA BxAxC CxBxA	BxAxC CxBxA AxCxB; CxAxB BxCxA CxBxA; AxBxC AxCxB BxAxC
Solution 12	CxBxA AxCxB BxAxC; BxCxA BxAxC AxBxC; AxCxB CxBxA CxAxB	CxAxB AxBxC AxCxB; AxBxC CxAxB BxCxA; BxCxA BxAxC CxBxA	BxAxC BxCxA CxBxA; CxAxB CxBxA AxCxB; AxBxC AxCxB BxAxC
Solution 13	CxBxA AxCxB BxAxC; BxCxA BxAxC AxBxC; AxCxB CxAxB CxBxA	CxAxB AxBxC AxCxB; AxBxC BxCxA CxAxB; BxCxA CxBxA BxAxC	BxAxC CxBxA BxCxA; CxAxB AxCxB CxBxA; AxBxC BxAxC AxCxB
Solution 14	CxBxA AxCxB BxAxC; BxCxA BxAxC AxBxC; AxCxB CxAxB CxBxA	BxAxC AxBxC AxCxB; AxCxB CxBxA CxAxB; CxBxA BxCxA BxAxC	CxAxB CxBxA BxCxA; BxAxC AxCxB CxBxA; AxBxC BxAxC AxCxB
Solution 15	CxBxA BxCxA CxAxB; BxCxA CxAxB AxBxC; AxCxB AxBxC BxAxC	CxAxB AxBxC BxCxA; AxBxC BxAxC AxCxB; BxCxA CxBxA CxAxB	BxAxC AxCxB AxBxC; CxAxB BxCxA CxBxA; AxBxC CxAxB BxCxA
Solution 16	CxBxA BxCxA CxAxB; BxCxA CxAxB AxBxC; AxCxB AxBxC BxAxC	CxAxB AxBxC BxCxA; AxBxC BxAxC AxCxB; BxCxA CxAxB CxBxA	BxAxC AxCxB AxBxC; CxAxB CxBxA BxCxA; AxBxC BxCxA CxAxB
Solution 17	CxBxA BxCxA CxAxB; BxCxA CxAxB AxBxC; AxCxB AxBxC BxAxC	CxAxB AxCxB AxBxC; AxBxC BxAxC BxCxA; BxCxA CxAxB CxBxA	BxAxC AxBxC BxCxA; CxAxB CxBxA AxCxB; AxBxC BxCxA CxAxB
Solution 18	CxBxA BxCxA CxAxB; BxCxA CxAxB AxBxC; AxCxB AxBxC BxAxC	BxAxC AxCxB AxBxC; CxAxB BxCxA CxBxA; AxBxC CxAxB BxCxA	CxAxB AxBxC BxCxA; AxBxC BxAxC AxCxB; BxCxA CxBxA CxAxB
Solution 19	CxBxA BxCxA CxAxB; BxCxA CxAxB AxBxC; AxCxB AxBxC BxAxC	AxCxB BxAxC CxBxA; BxAxC AxBxC BxCxA; CxBxA CxAxB AxCxB	AxBxC AxCxB BxAxC; CxAxB CxBxA AxCxB; BxAxC BxCxA CxBxA
Solution 20	CxBxA BxCxA CxAxB; BxCxA CxAxB AxBxC; AxCxB AxBxC BxAxC	AxCxB BxAxC CxBxA; BxAxC AxBxC AxCxB; CxBxA CxAxB BxCxA	AxBxC AxCxB BxAxC; CxAxB BxCxA CxBxA; BxAxC CxBxA AxCxB
Solution 21	CxBxA BxCxA CxAxB; BxCxA CxAxB AxBxC; AxCxB AxBxC BxAxC	AxBxC AxCxB BxAxC; BxAxC BxCxA CxBxA; CxBxA CxAxB AxCxB	AxCxB BxAxC CxBxA; CxAxB AxBxC AxCxB; BxAxC CxBxA BxCxA

== Higher dimensions ==
Solution to the 2d puzzle

A two-dimensional analogue of the puzzle asks to pack four identical rectangles of side lengths x and y into a square of side length x + y; as the figure shows, this is always possible. In d dimensions the puzzle asks to pack d^{d} identical blocks into a hypercube. By a result of Raphael M. Robinson this is again solvable whenever d = d_{1} × d_{2} for two numbers d_{1} and d_{2} such that the d_{1}- and d_{2}-dimensional cases are themselves solvable. For instance, according to this result, it is solvable for dimensions 4, 6, 8, 9, and other 3-smooth numbers. In all dimensions, the inequality of arithmetic and geometric means shows that the volume of the pieces is less than the volume of the hypercube into which they should be packed. However, it is unknown whether the puzzle can be solved in five dimensions, or in higher prime number dimensions.
