= Jean Scholtz =

American computer scientist

Jean Clarice Scholtz is an American computer scientist known for her contributions to human–computer interaction, and particularly for developing the "Common Industry Format" (CIF) for usability test results while at the National Institute of Standards and Technology.

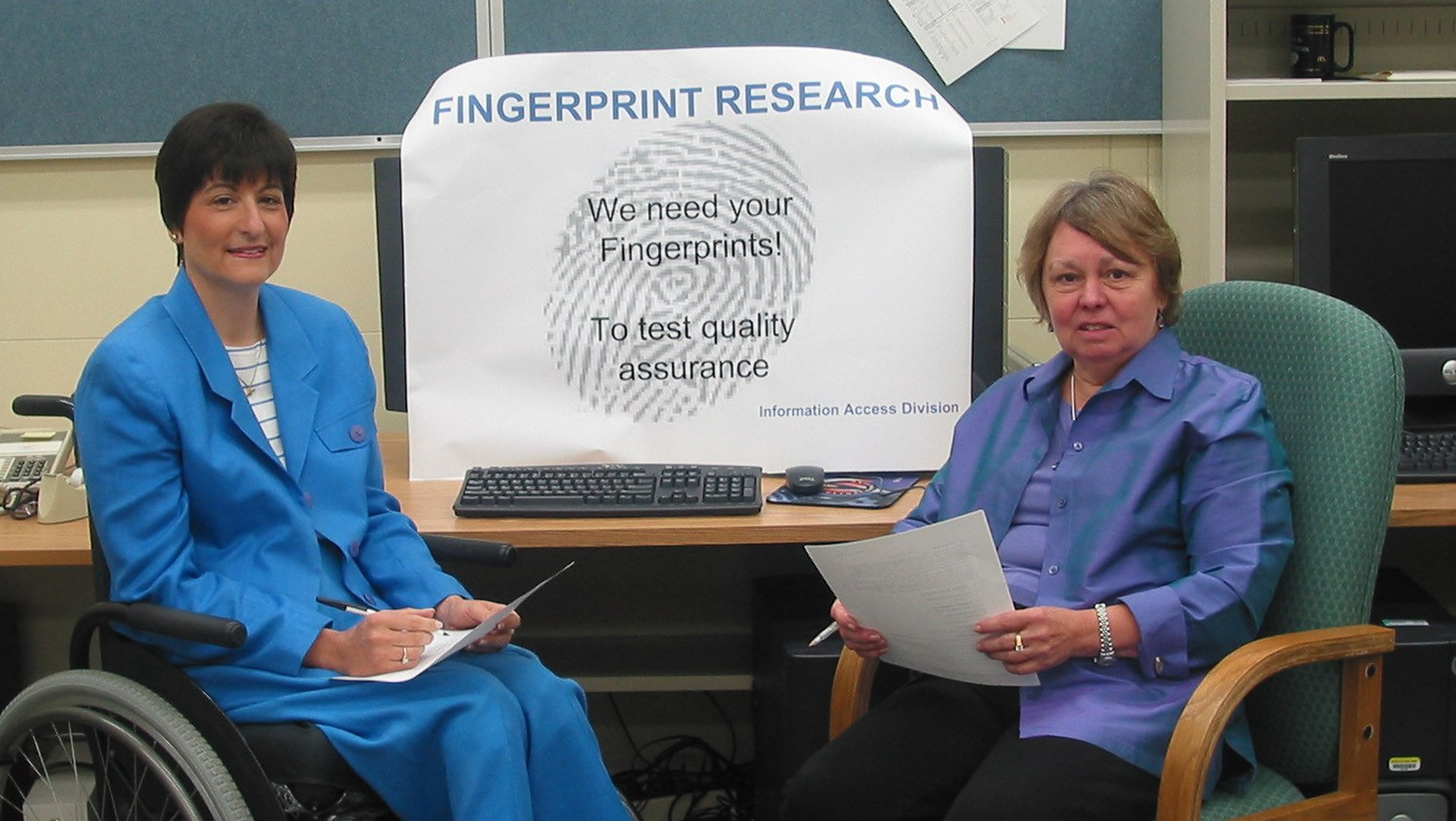
Mary Theofanos (left) and Jean Scholtz of ITL collect data in the usability study of biometrics systems. (September 2005)

== Education and career ==
Scholtz has a bachelor's degree from the University of Iowa. She earned a master's degree from the Stevens Institute of Technology, and completed her Ph.D. in 1989 in computer science at the University of Nebraska–Lincoln. Her dissertation was A study of transfer of skill between programming languages, and was jointly supervised by Susan Wiedenbeck and David A. Klarner.

After completing her doctorate, Scholtz became a faculty member at Portland State University, and moved from there to Intel and then the National Institute of Standards and Technology. While at the National Institute of Standards and Technology, she also served as a program manager for the Defense Advanced Research Projects Agency. Scholtz retired from the National Institute of Standards and Technology in 2006, and became Chief Scientist for Visual Analytics at the Pacific Northwest National Laboratory.

== Recognition ==
SIGCHI gave Scholtz their Lifetime Service Award in 2015. She was elected to the CHI Academy in 2018.
