= Cathedral (board game) =

1979 strategy game by Robert Moore

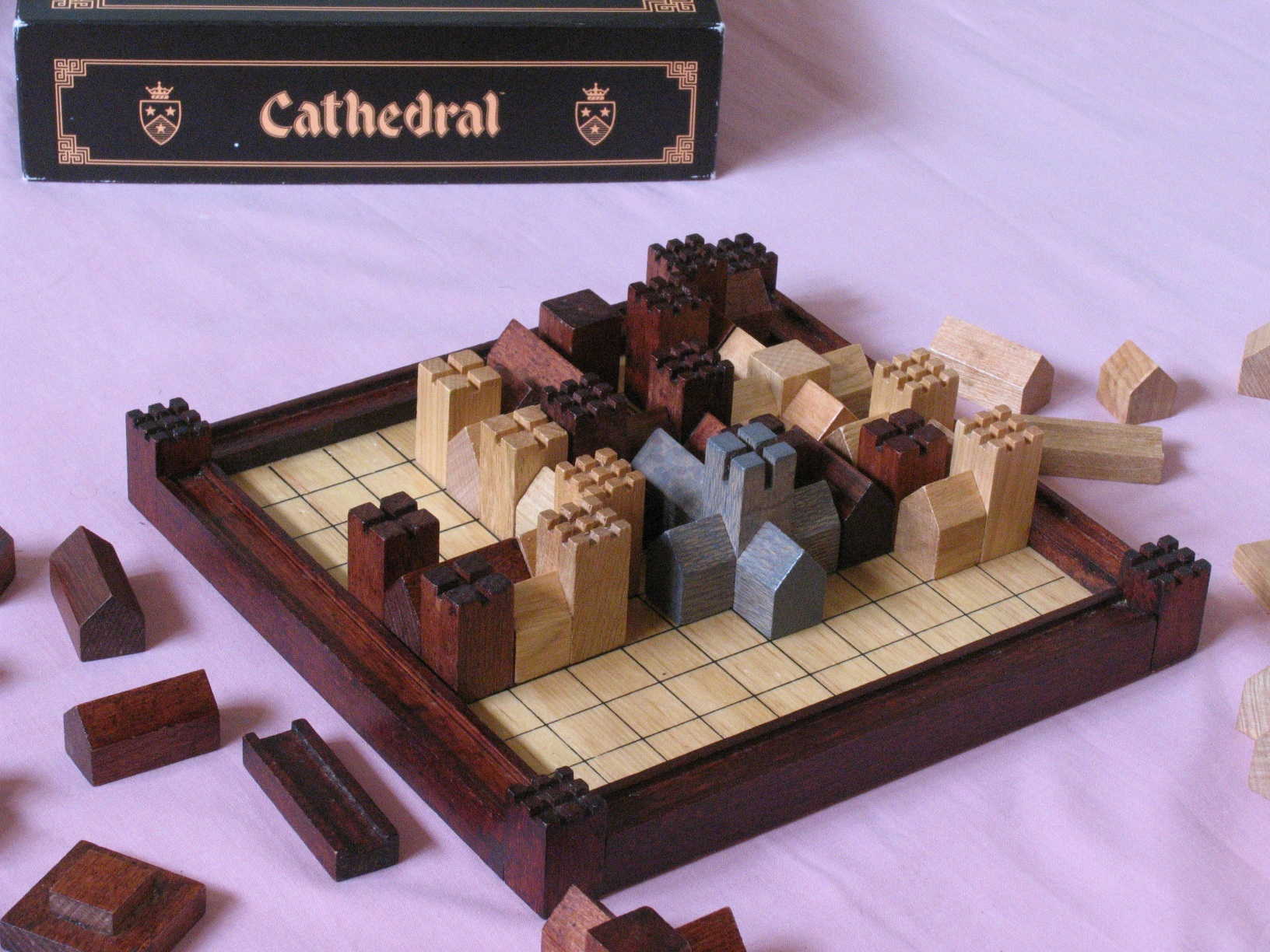
- Cathedral (standard version), showing the "dark" and "light" pieces, plus Cathedral in grey
- Designers: Robert Moore
- Illustrators: S. Mattusek
- Publication: 1979; 47 years ago
- Genres: Abstract strategy game
- Players: 2
- Playing time: 20 minutes
- Age range: 8+
- Website: http://www.cathedral-game.co.nz/index.html

Cathedral, also known as Cathedral: The Game of the Mediaeval City, is a two-player abstract strategy game designed by Robert Moore and first published in 1979, in which dark and light factions vie for territorial supremacy within the bounds of a medieval city. Players play pieces to capture territory on a game board, attempting to place all or most of their game pieces while preventing their opponent from doing likewise. The game's copyright is currently owned by Chrisbo I.P. Holdings Limited in New Zealand.

== History ==
Cathedral was invented between 1962 and 1979 by Robert Moore, a pilot in the Royal New Zealand Air Force. Inspiration for the game was provided by Christchurch Cathedral and its environs in Christchurch, New Zealand. From the air, Moore was fascinated by the way the cathedral and neighbouring buildings intricately fit together, like pieces of a jigsaw puzzle.

In 1979 Moore presented a prototype version to Brightway Products, a New Zealand wooden toy and game company. Two versions of the game were originally created: a "formal piece" using three-dimensional wooden models of mediaeval buildings and towers, and an "abstract piece" consisting of two-dimensional squares. The formal piece proved more popular and is the only version produced today.

A plastic moulded version with very highly detailed parts and a gridded locking system was published by Mattel in 1985.

== Gameplay ==
Game pieces of Cathedral in military projection, numbers denoting footprint in squares. *Only the Abbey and Academy are chiral in gameplay.

Cathedral is played on a wooden board divided into a 10x10 grid and enclosed by turreted walls, representing a medieval city. It is played with 29 pieces, each of which are small abstracts of buildings: 14 dark pieces, 14 light pieces, and one grey piece– the Cathedral. All pieces except the Abbey and the Academy are the same between colours.

The player using the light pieces begins by placing the Cathedral anywhere in the play area, aligned with the squares. The dark player then places one of their game pieces on the board. Play alternates until one side cannot make a move. The other side then attempts to place all its remaining pieces in areas they have captured.

Players capture territory within the city by completely enclosing it with their pieces or with the help of the city walls. Boundaries of these areas must be "wall to wall" such that surrounding pieces touching only at the corners are not enough to capture. If the captured territory contains only one of the opponent's pieces or the Cathedral, that piece may be removed and the opponent may no longer place pieces in that area. A player's removed piece can return to play later, but the cathedral is removed for the remainder of the game. If the territory contains more than one piece, it is not captured and remains available for the opponent to use.

The winner is the player who manages to place all their pieces while preventing their opponent from doing so. If neither player can place all their pieces, the player whose remaining pieces would take up the smaller area is the winner.

== Reception ==
Wirecutter listed Cathedral as one of the best board games as of 2023, with Winnie Yang praising the game for its simple rules, fast pace, and "beautifully made" design. Wolfgang Baur, in the book Family Games: The 100 Best, described the game as "board gaming nirvana" because of "its speed, its simplicity, and the sheer joy of placing that one, perfect piece that seals your opponent's doom." In a review for Issue #43 of Games, senior editor R. Wayne Schmittberger described Cathedral as "an exceptional game for both its visual beauty and intriguing gameplay." In a brief review for Issue #3, Abstract Strategy compared the game to Pentominoes and Go, praising its medieval city theme and "the attractiveness of its playing equipment."

Ludologist Tom Lehmann noted that the game was broken because there exists an opening strategy for the first player that cannot be countered by the second player. He suggested a fix for this where the second player instead places the Cathedral along with their first piece.

In 1983, Cathedral was the recipient of the Designmark Award.
