= Rumis =

3D building and strategy board game whose pieces are polycubes

- Designers: Stefan Kögl
- Publishers: Sekkoia, Educational Insights, Murmel Spielwerkstatt und Verlag, Alary Games, Bambus Spieleverlag
- Players: 2–4
- Setup time: 2 minutes
- Playing time: 15−45 minutes
- Chance: None
- Age range: 8 and up
- Skills: Strategic thought, spatial visualization ability

Rumis is a 3D building and strategy board game from Stefan Kögl, published in 2003 by Murmel Spielwerkstatt und Verlag. The gameplay is about optimal placement of blocks of various shapes within a confined space. Rumi means "stone" in Quechua. The theme and artworks are inspired by the Inca architecture.

Rumis has also been published under the name Blokus 3D, with a different packaging but exactly the same rules.

Rumis and Blokus 3D won several awards around the world.

== Rules ==
=== Equipment ===
There are several playing boards available; each board has a different architectural theme, shows the corresponding ideal structure, and gives the maximum height for the stack according to the number of players.

The pieces are four sets of the eleven possible polycubes composed of two, three, and four (unit) cubes. In each set, each block has a different shape (but two of the four-cube blocks are chiral: they mirror each other). One set is all red, one yellow, one green, and one blue.

=== Setup ===
Together, the players choose one of the playing boards. The game starts with the board empty. Each player chooses one of the sets of pieces, and should have all the blocks of their color available to them.

=== Object ===
The goal of the game is for a player to have the most unit squares of their color visible from right above the stack at the end of the game.

=== Play ===
Play rotates among the players. Any played piece must rest wholly on the board or an already placed piece, so that there is no empty space underneath part of it, and so that it doesn't protrude beyond the ideal structure or above the maximum height. The first played piece may be placed anywhere on the board. Any other piece played in the first round must touch an already placed piece of another than its own color by at least one unit square. In each following round, any played piece must touch an already placed piece of its own color by at least one unit square.

If a player cannot legally play (which may happen because either no square of their color is visible anymore, or they have already placed all their pieces, or placing any of their remaining pieces would protrude beyond the ideal structure or above the maximum height), they are not allowed to play until the end of the game. Play continues until no player can legally play.

At the end of the game, players are penalized one point for each of their pieces that they have not placed, and earn one point for each unit square of their pieces which is visible when looking straight down from above the stack. The winner is the player with the highest score.

== Strategy ==
In Rumis, the strategic element is not as deep as in other block games, such as Pueblo. However, Rumis does have a strategic element: limiting other players' possibilities and (from above) visible unit squares, ensuring that oneself has space and simple pieces to make more plays, and saving one's own pieces with large surface areas to place at the top of the stack.

== Variants and spinoffs ==
Rumis is available in a standard edition, a standard kit, and an extra kit with more pieces and playing boards.

- Rumis can be played by two players, with each player controlling two colors.
- Rumis can be played as a solitaire game creating a soma cube with some number of pieces.

In 2005, Murmel Spielwerkstatt und Verlag published a new edition of Rumis, featuring more playing boards, and proposing more possible game rules.

In 2006, Murmel Spielwerkstatt und Verlag published an extension of the game: Rumis+, featuring other (orange and violet) pieces for two players (thus for up to six players if joined to the standard pieces), other playing boards, and proposing other possible game rules.

In 2008, Rumis was rebranded by Mattel to Blokus 3D.

== Honors and awards ==
Stefan Kögl won the second prize at the 2001 International Game Designers Competition (Hippodice Competition) for Rumis. Rumis won the 2003 Spiel des Jahres ("Game of the Year") Prize, the 2004 Mensa Select Award, the 2005 Major Fun Award, and a Sceau d'excellence Option consommateurs (Protégez-vous) 2005 — "2005 Consumers Option (Protect Yourself) Seal of Excellence".

Blokus 3D won the 2008 Japan Boardgame Prize U-more Award.

== See also ==
- Herzberger Quader — for pieces (and Tower board base shape)
