= Dean G. Hoffman =

American mathematician (1949–2022)

- Born: May 8, 1949
- Died: November 11, 2022 (aged 73)
- Education: Union College (BA, 1970); University of Michigan; University of Waterloo (PhD, 1976)
- Spouse: Gail Coblick Hoffman
- Children: 2
- Scientific career
- Fields: mathematics
- Thesis: Sets of Integers Closed Under Affine Operations (1976)
- Academic advisors: David Anthony Klarner; Ronald C. Mullin

Dean Gunnar Hoffman (May 8, 1949 – November 11, 2022) was an American mathematician who worked primarily in graph theory, design theory, number theory, and puzzles.

== Early life and education ==
Hoffman was born on May 8, 1949. He was a backgammon player and would commonly play with students and collaborators. In 1970, he obtained his BA in mathematics from Union College. He then went on to be advised by David Klarner and Ron Mullin and obtain his PhD in mathematics from the University of Waterloo in 1976.

== Career ==
He began working at Auburn University in 1977 until his death in 2022.

== Awards and honors ==
He has been awarded the Marie Kraska Award for the Excellence in Teaching in 2017 and 2022.

In 2008, he was an invited speaker for the first Istanbul Design Theory and Combinatorics Conference which was held to celebrate the 70th birthday of Curt Lindner, one of his collaborators. In 2014, Hoffman was invited to give the keynote address for the 8th Annual Troy MathFest at Troy University at Montgomery.

== Puzzles ==
The Hoffman's packing puzzle is an assembly puzzle which is named after Hoffman, who described it in 1978. The puzzle consists of 27 identical rectangular cuboids, each of whose edges have three different lengths. The goal of the puzzle is to assemble them all to fit within a cube whose edge length is the sum of the three lengths.

== Death and legacy ==
He died on November 11, 2022.

His family created the Dr. Dean G. Hoffman Endowed Graduate Award in his honor.

== Selected publications ==
=== Books ===
- Coding theory and cryptography: the essentials (2nd. rev. and expanded ed.). New York Basel: Marcel Dekker. 2000. ISBN 0-8247-0465-7.
- Coding theory: the essentials. New York: M. Dekker. 1991. ISBN 0-8247-8611-4.

=== Articles ===
- Colbourn, Charles J; Hoffman, Dean G; Rees, Rolf (January 1992). "A new class of group divisible designs with block size three". Journal of Combinatorial Theory, Series A. 59 (1): 73–89. doi:10.1016/0097-3165(92)90099-G.
- Hoffman, D.G.; Schellenberg, P.J. (December 1991). "The existence of Ck-factorizations of K2n − F". Discrete Mathematics. 97 (1–3): 243–250. doi:10.1016/0012-365X(91)90440-D.
- Hoffman, D. G.; Lindner, C. C.; Rodger, C. A. (September 1989). "On the construction of odd cycle systems". Journal of Graph Theory. 13 (4): 417–426. doi:10.1002/jgt.3190130405.
- Hoffman, D. G.; Rodger, C. A. (June 1992). "The chromatic index of complete multipartite graphs". Journal of Graph Theory. 16 (2): 159–163. doi:10.1002/jgt.3190160207.

== See also ==
- List of American mathematicians
- History of Auburn University
