= Guang Gong =

Chinese-Canadian electrical engineer

Guang Gong (born 1956) studied applied math whose research topics include lightweight cryptography and algebraic coding theory for wireless communication. Educated in Sichuan China, she works at the University of Waterloo in Canada as a professor in the department of Electrical and Computer Engineering and University Research Chair.

== Education ==
After a 2-year program at Xichang Normal Vocational School, Gong was given a master's degree in applied mathematics in 1985 at the Northwest Institute of Telecommunication Engineering. She completed her PhD in 1990 at the University of Electronic Science and Technology of China.

She was a postdoctoral researcher with the Fondazione Ugo Bordoni in Italy. From 1996 to 1998 she was affiliated working with Solomon W. Golomb. She moved to the University of Waterloo as an adjunct and later associate professor, and has been full professor there since 2004. She was given a University Research Chair in 2018.

== Books ==
Gong's books include:

- Signal Design for Good Correlation: For Wireless Communication, Cryptography and Radar (with Solomon W. Golomb, Cambridge University Press, 2005)
- Communication System Security (with Lidong Chen, CRC Press, 2012)
- The Wisdom Of Solomon: The Genius And Legacy Of Solomon Golomb (edited with Beatrice Golomb and Alfred W. Hales, World Scientific, 2023)

== Recognition ==
Gong was elected as an IEEE Fellow in 2014, "for contributions to sequences and cryptography applied to communications and security".
