= Heptomino =

Geometric shape formed from seven squares

The 108 free heptominoes

A heptomino/septomino/7-omino is a polyomino of order 7; that is, a polygon in the plane made of 7 equal-sized squares connected edge to edge. The name of this type is formed with the prefix hept(a)-. When rotations and reflections are not considered to be distinct shapes, there are 108 different free heptominoes. When reflections are considered distinct, there are 196 one-sided heptominoes. When rotations are also considered distinct, there are 760 fixed heptominoes.

== Symmetry ==
The figure shows all possible free heptominoes, coloured according to their symmetry groups:

- 84 heptominoes (coloured grey) have no symmetry. Their symmetry group consists only of the identity mapping.
- 9 heptominoes (coloured red) have an axis of reflection symmetry aligned with the gridlines. Their symmetry group has two elements, the identity and the reflection in a line parallel to the sides of the squares.

- 7 heptominoes (coloured green) have an axis of reflection symmetry at 45° to the gridlines. Their symmetry group has two elements, the identity and a diagonal reflection.

- 4 heptominoes (coloured blue) have point symmetry, also known as rotational symmetry of order 2. Their symmetry group has two elements, the identity and the 180° rotation.

- 3 heptominoes (coloured purple) have two axes of reflection symmetry, both aligned with the gridlines. Their symmetry group has four elements, the identity, two reflections and the 180° rotation. It is the dihedral group of order 2, also known as the Klein four-group.
- 1 heptomino (coloured orange) has two axes of reflection symmetry, both aligned with the diagonals. Its symmetry group also has four elements. Its symmetry group is also the dihedral group of order 2 with four elements.

If reflections of a heptomino are considered distinct, as they are with one-sided heptominoes, then the first and fourth categories above would each double in size, resulting in an extra 88 heptominoes for a total of 196. If rotations are also considered distinct, then the heptominoes from the first category count eightfold, the ones from the next three categories count fourfold, and the ones from the last two categories count twice. This results in 84 × 8 + (9+7+4) × 4 + (3+1) × 2 = 760 fixed heptominoes.

== Packing and tiling ==
Of the 108 free heptominoes, 101 satisfy the Conway criterion and 3 more can form a patch satisfying the criterion. Only 4 heptominoes fail to satisfy the criterion and these 4 are unable to tessellate the plane.

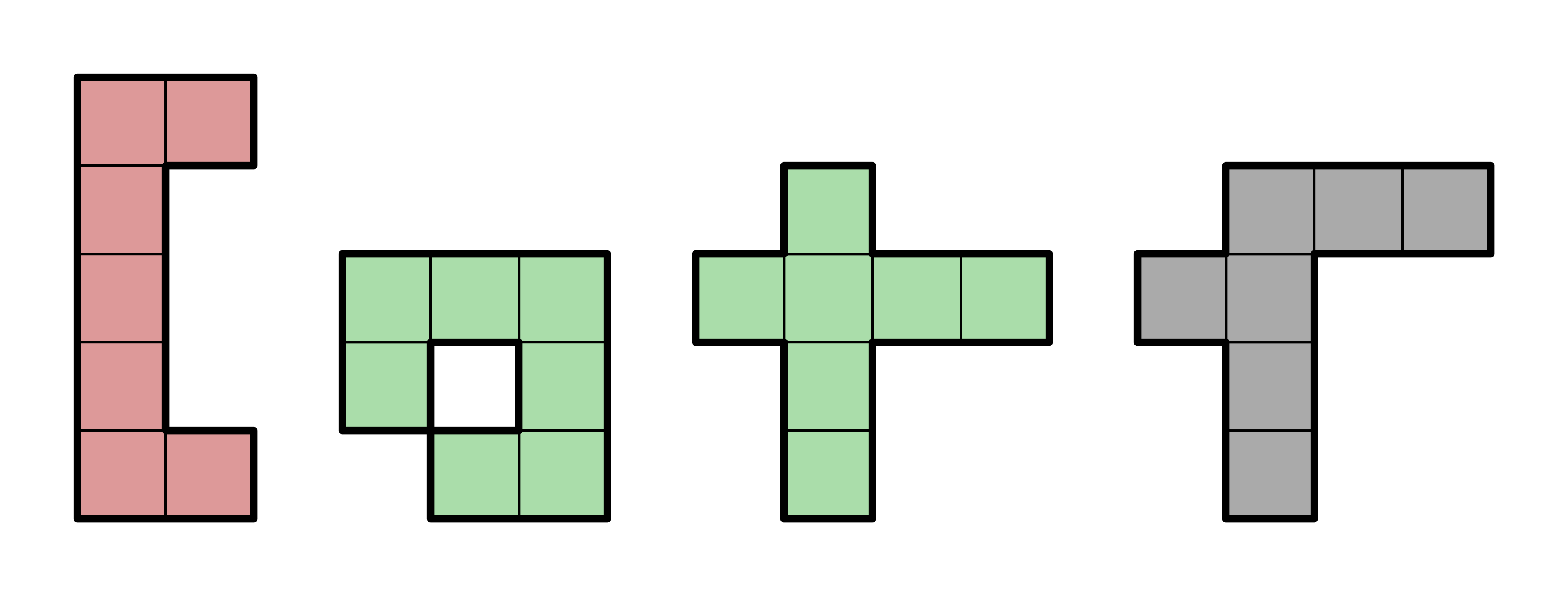
The four heptominoes incapable of tiling a plane, including the one heptomino with a hole

Although a complete set of the 108 free heptominoes has a total of 756 squares, it is not possible to tile a rectangle with that set. The proof of this is trivial, since there is one heptomino which has a hole. Also, there's no chance to form a 757-square rectangle because 757 is a prime number.

However, the set of 107 simply connected free heptominoes—that is, the ones without the hole—can tile a 7 by 107 (749-square) rectangle. Furthermore, the complete set of free heptominoes can tile three 11-by-23 (253-square) rectangles, each with a one-square hole in the center; the complete set can also tile twelve 8 by 8 (64-square) squares with a one-square hole in the "center".
