= David A. Klarner =

American mathematician (1940–1999)

- Born: David Anthony Klarner; October 10, 1940; Fort Bragg, California
- Died: March 20, 1999 (aged 58); Eureka, California
- Education: University of Alberta
- Known for: Combinatorics; Klarner's Theorem; Klarner-Rado Sequence; Recreational mathematics
- Scientific career
- Fields: Mathematics
- Workplaces: University of Calgary
- Thesis: On some combinatorial and probabilistic aspects of bipartite graphs
- Doctoral advisor: John W. Moon
- Doctoral students: Jean Scholtz; Dean Hoffman

David Anthony Klarner (October 10, 1940 – March 20, 1999) was an American mathematician, author, and educator. He is known for his work in combinatorial enumeration, polyominoes, and box-packing.

Klarner was a friend and correspondent of mathematics popularizer Martin Gardner and frequently made contributions to Gardner's Mathematical Games column in Scientific American. He edited a book honoring Gardner on the occasion of his 65th birthday. Gardner in turn dedicated his twelfth collection of mathematical games columns to Klarner.

Beginning in 1969 Klarner made significant contributions to the theory of combinatorial enumeration, especially focusing on polyominoes and box-packing. Working with Ronald L. Rivest he found upper bounds on the number of n-ominoes. Klarner's Theorem is the statement that an m by n rectangle can be packed with 1-by-x rectangles if and only if x divides one of m and n.

He has also published important results in group theory and number theory, in particular working on the Collatz conjecture (sometimes called the 3x + 1 problem). The Klarner-Rado Sequence is named after Klarner and Richard Rado.

== Biography ==
Klarner was born in Fort Bragg, California, and spent his childhood in Napa, California. He married Kara Lynn Klarner in 1961. Their son Carl Eoin Klarner was born on April 21, 1969.

Klarner did his undergraduate work at Humboldt State University (1960–63), got his Ph.D. at the University of Alberta (1963–66), and did post-doctoral work at McMaster University in Hamilton, Ontario (1966–68). He also did post-doctoral work at Eindhoven University of Technology in the Netherlands (1968–1970), at the University of Reading in England working with Richard Rado (1970–71), and at Stanford University (1971–73). He served as an assistant professor at Binghamton University (1973–79) and was a visiting professor at Humboldt State University in California (1979–80). He returned to Eindhoven as a professor (1980–81), and to Binghamton (1981–82). From 1982 to 1996 he was a professor of computer science at the University of Nebraska–Lincoln, with a one-year break at Eindhoven in academic year 1991–92. He retired to Eureka, California in 1997 and died there in 1999.

He was a frequent contributor to recreational mathematics and worked with many key mathematics popularizers including Ronald L. Rivest, John H. Conway, Richard K. Guy, Donald Coxeter, Ronald Graham, and Donald Knuth.

== Organizations and awards ==
Klarner was a member of the Association for Computing Machinery, the American Mathematical Society, the Mathematical Association of America, and the Fibonacci Association. He was awarded a National Science Foundation Fellowship Award in mathematics in 1963. In 1986 Klarner received a University of Nebraska-Lincoln Distinguished Teaching Award in Computer Science.

The David A. Klarner Fellowship for Computer Science was set up after Klarner's death by Spyros Magliveras a fellow professor in Computer Science at UNL.

== Bibliography ==
- Asymptotically Optimal Box Packing Theorems: Klarner systems by Michael Reid, Department of Mathematics, University of Central Florida, June, 2008
- A Lifetime of Puzzles edited by Erik D. Demaine, Martin L. Demaine, Tom Rodgers; pp. 221–225: Satterfield's Tomb, a puzzle by David A. Klarner and Wade Satterfield; ISBN 1568812450

== Selected publications ==
=== Books ===
- The Mathematical Gardner (editor), Publisher: Boston : Prindle, Weber & Schmidt; Belmont, Calif. : Wadsworth International, ISBN 0486400891, ISBN 9781468466867 (electronic book)

=== Papers ===
- Polyominoes by Gill Barequet, Solomon W. Golomb, and David A. Klarner, December 2016
- The number of tilings of a block with blocks (with F. S. S. Magliveras), European Journal of Combinatorics: Volume 9 Issue 4, July 1988
- The number of tiered posets modulo six Discrete Mathematics, Vol. 62, Issue 3, pp. 295–297, December 1986
- Asymptotics for coefficients of algebraic functions (with Patricia Woodworth), Aequationes Mathematicae, Volume 23, Issue 1, pp. 236–241, December 1981
- An algorithm to determine when certain sets have 0-density Journal of Algorithms, Vol. 2, Issue 1, Pages 31–43, March 1981
- Some remarks on the Cayley-Hamilton theorem American Mathematical Monthly, Vol. 83, No. 5, pp. 367–369, May, 1976
- Asymptotic bounds for the number of convex n-ominoes (with Ronald L. Rivest), Discrete Mathematics, Vol. 8, Issue 1, pp. 31–40, March 1974
- A finite basis theorem revisited Stanford University: Computer Science Department, April 1973
- The number of SDR's in certain regular systems Stanford University: Computer Science Department, April 1973
- Selected combinatorial research problems (with Václav Chvátal and Donald E. Knuth), Stanford University: Computer Science Department, June 1972
- Sets generated by iteration of a linear operation Stanford University: Computer Science Department, March 1972
- Linear Combinations of Sets of Consecutive Integers (with Richard Rado), Stanford University: Computer Science Department, March 1972
- Sets generated by iteration of a linear operation Stanford University: Computer Science Department, March 1972
- Packing a rectangle with congruent n-ominoes Journal of Combinatorial Theory, Vol. 7, Issue 2, Pages 107–115, September 1969
- Packing boxes with congruent figures (with F. Göbel), Indagationes Mathematicae 31, pp. 465–472, MR 40 #6362, 1969
- Some Results Concerning Polyominoes Fibonacci Quarterly, 3, pp. 9–20, February 1965
