= 369 (disambiguation) =

369 most commonly refers to:

- 369 (number)
- 369 AD, a year
- 369 BC, a year

369 may also refer to:

- A Singapore gang, also known as Salakau in Hokkien
- "3-6-9", a song by Cupid featuring B.o.B from Time for a Change
- "369", a song from the Buzzcocks album Trade Test Transmissions

== See also ==
- 369th (disambiguation)
- List of highways numbered 369
