= Polyomino =

Geometric shape formed from squares

The 18 one-sided pentominoes, including 6 mirrored pairs

A polyomino is a connected plane geometric figure formed by joining a finite number of unit squares edge-to-edge. It is a polyform whose cells are squares. It may be regarded as a finite and connected subset of the regular square tiling.

Polyominoes have been used in popular puzzles since at least 1907, and the enumeration of pentominoes is dated to antiquity. Many results with the pieces made of 1 to 6 squares were first published in Fairy Chess Review between the years 1937 and 1957, under the name of "dissection problems." The name polyomino was invented by Solomon W. Golomb in 1953, and it was popularized by Martin Gardner in a November 1960 "Mathematical Games" column in Scientific American.

Related to polyominoes are polyiamonds, formed from equilateral triangles; polyhexes, formed from regular hexagons; and other plane polyforms. Polyominoes have been generalized to higher dimensions by joining cubes to form polycubes, or hypercubes to form polyhypercubes.

In statistical physics, the study of polyominoes and their higher-dimensional analogs (which are often referred to as lattice animals in this literature) is applied to problems in physics and chemistry. Polyominoes have been used as models of branched polymers and of percolation clusters.

Polyominoes also appear in commutative algebra. In this context, a polyomino can be used to define a binomial ideal generated by inner 2-minors in a polynomial ring whose variables correspond to the vertices of the polyomino, generalizing classical determinantal ideals of matrices.

Like many puzzles in recreational mathematics, polyominoes raise many combinatorial problems. The most basic one is enumerating polyominoes of a given size. No formula has been found except for special classes of polyominoes. A number of estimates are known, and there are algorithms for calculating them.

Polyominoes with holes are inconvenient for some purposes, such as tiling problems. In some contexts polyominoes with holes are excluded, allowing only simply connected polyominoes.

== Enumeration of polyominoes ==
Free polyominoes with n = 2 to 6

The single free domino

The two free trominoes

The five free tetrominoes

The 12 free pentominoes, colored according to their symmetry

The 35 free hexominoes, colored according to their symmetry

=== Free, one-sided, and fixed polyominoes ===
There are three common ways of distinguishing polyominoes for enumeration:

- free polyominoes are distinct when none is a rigid transformation (translation, rotation, reflection, or glide reflection) of another (pieces that can be picked up and flipped over). Translating, rotating, reflecting, or glide reflecting a free polyomino does not change its shape.
- one-sided polyominoes are distinct when none is a translation or rotation of another (pieces that cannot be flipped over). Translating or rotating a one-sided polyomino does not change its shape.
- fixed polyominoes are distinct when none is a translation of another (pieces that can be neither flipped nor rotated). Translating a fixed polyomino will not change its shape.

The following table shows the numbers of polyominoes of various types with n cells.

n	name	free			one-sided	fixed
n	name	total	with holes	without holes	one-sided	fixed
1	monomino	1	0	1	1	1
2	domino	1	0	1	1	2
3	tromino	2	0	2	2	6
4	tetromino	5	0	5	7	19
5	pentomino	12	0	12	18	63
6	hexomino	35	0	35	60	216
7	heptomino	108	1	107	196	760
8	octomino	369	6	363	704	2,725
9	nonomino	1,285	37	1,248	2,500	9,910
10	decomino	4,655	195	4,460	9,189	36,446
11	undecomino	17,073	979	16,094	33,896	135,268
12	dodecomino	63,600	4,663	58,937	126,759	505,861
13	tridecomino	238,591	21,474	217,117	476,270	1,903,890
OEIS sequence		A000105	A001419	A000104	A000988	A001168

Fixed polyominoes were enumerated in 2004 up to n = 56 by Iwan Jensen, and in 2024 up to n = 70 by Gill Barequet and Gil Ben-Shachar.

Free polyominoes were enumerated in 2007 up to n = 28 by Tomás Oliveira e Silva, in 2012 up to n = 45 by Toshihiro Shirakawa, in 2023 up to n = 50 by John Mason, and in 2025 up to n = 59 by Toshihiro Shirakawa.

The above OEIS sequences, with the exception of A001419, include the count of 1 for the number of null-polyominoes; a null-polyomino is one that is formed of zero squares.

=== Symmetries of polyominoes ===
The dihedral group D_{4} is the group of symmetries (symmetry group) of a square. This group contains four rotations and four reflections. It is generated by alternating reflections about the x-axis and about a diagonal. One free polyomino corresponds to at most 8 fixed polyominoes, which are its images under the symmetries of D_{4}. However, those images are not necessarily distinct: the more symmetry a free polyomino has, the fewer distinct fixed counterparts it has. Therefore, a free polyomino that is invariant under some or all non-trivial symmetries of D_{4} may correspond to only 4, 2 or 1 fixed polyominoes. Mathematically, free polyominoes are equivalence classes of fixed polyominoes under the group D_{4}.

Polyominoes have the following possible symmetries; the least number of squares needed in a polyomino with that symmetry is given in each case:

- 8 fixed polyominoes for each free polyomino:
  - no symmetry (4)
- 4 fixed polyominoes for each free polyomino:
  - mirror symmetry with respect to one of the grid line directions (4)
  - mirror symmetry with respect to a diagonal line (3)
  - 2-fold rotational symmetry: C_{2} (4)
- 2 fixed polyominoes for each free polyomino:
  - symmetry with respect to both grid line directions, and hence also 2-fold rotational symmetry: D_{2} (2) (also known as the Klein four-group)
  - symmetry with respect to both diagonal directions, and hence also 2-fold rotational symmetry: D_{2} (7)
  - 4-fold rotational symmetry: C_{4} (8)
- 1 fixed polyomino for each free polyomino:
  - all symmetry of the square: D_{4} (1).

In the same way, the number of one-sided polyominoes depends on polyomino symmetry as follows:

- 2 one-sided polyominoes for each free polyomino:
  - no symmetry
  - 2-fold rotational symmetry: C_{2}
  - 4-fold rotational symmetry: C_{4}
- 1 one-sided polyomino for each free polyomino:
  - all symmetry of the square: D_{4}
  - mirror symmetry with respect to one of the grid line directions
  - mirror symmetry with respect to a diagonal line
  - symmetry with respect to both grid line directions, and hence also 2-fold rotational symmetry: D_{2}
  - symmetry with respect to both diagonal directions, and hence also 2-fold rotational symmetry: D_{2}.

The following table shows the numbers of polyominoes with n squares, sorted by symmetry groups.

n	none	mirror 90°	mirror 45°	C_{2}	D_{2} 90°	D_{2} 45°	C_{4}	D_{4}
1	0	0	0	0	0	0	0	1
2	0	0	0	0	1	0	0	0
3	0	0	1	0	1	0	0	0
4	1	1	0	1	1	0	0	1
5	5	2	2	1	1	0	0	1
6	20	6	2	5	2	0	0	0
7	84	9	7	4	3	1	0	0
8	316	23	5	18	4	1	1	1
9	1,196	38	26	19	4	0	0	2
10	4,461	90	22	73	8	1	0	0
11	16,750	147	91	73	10	2	0	0
12	62,878	341	79	278	15	3	3	3
OEIS sequence	A006749	A006746	A006748	A006747	A056877	A056878	A144553	A142886

=== Algorithms for enumeration of fixed polyominoes ===
==== Inductive algorithms ====
Each polyomino of size n+1 can be obtained by adding a square to a polyomino of size n. This leads to algorithms for generating polyominoes inductively.

Most simply, given a list of polyominoes of size n, squares may be added next to each polyomino in each possible position, and the resulting polyomino of size n+1 added to the list if not a duplicate of one already found; refinements in ordering the enumeration and marking adjacent squares that should not be considered reduce the number of cases that need to be checked for duplicates. This method may be used to enumerate either free or fixed polyominoes.

A more sophisticated method, described by Redelmeier, has been used by many authors as a way of not only counting polyominoes (without requiring that all polyominoes of size n be stored in size to enumerate those of size n+1), but also proving upper bounds on their number. The basic idea is that we begin with a single square, and from there, recursively add squares. Depending on the details, it may count each n-omino n times, once from starting from each of its n squares, or may be arranged to count each once only.

The simplest implementation involves adding one square at a time. Beginning with an initial square, number the adjacent squares, clockwise from the top, 1, 2, 3, and 4. Now pick a number between 1 and 4, and add a square at that location. Number the unnumbered adjacent squares, starting with 5. Then, pick a number larger than the previously picked number, and add that square. Continue picking a number larger than the number of the current square, adding that square, and then numbering the new adjacent squares. When n squares have been created, an n-omino has been created.

This method ensures that each fixed polyomino is counted exactly n times, once for each starting square. It can be optimized so that it counts each polyomino only once, rather than n times. Starting with the initial square, declare it to be the lower-left square of the polyomino. Simply do not number any square that is on a lower row, or left of the square on the same row. This is the version described by Redelmeier.

If one wishes to count free polyominoes instead, then one may check for symmetries after creating each n-omino. However, it is faster to generate symmetric polyominoes separately (by a variation of this method) and so determine the number of free polyominoes by Burnside's lemma.

==== Transfer-matrix method ====
Currently, the most effective algorithms belong to the transfer-matrix paradigm. They may be called transfer matrix algorithms (TMAs) for short. Andrew Conway first implemented a TMA in the 90s, and calculated 25 terms of the fixed polyomino sequence (A001419 in the OEIS). Iwan Jensen refined Conway's methods and implemented a TMA in parallel for the first time in a pair of papers in the early 2000s. He calculated 56 terms. Because of this work, any TMA is sometimes also called Jensen's Algorithm. In 2024, Gill Barequet and his student Gil Ben-Shachar made another improvement by running a TMA on 45° rotation of the square grid, which is an equivalent problem but computationally easier. This approach holds the polyomino-counting record, with 70 terms.

As a rule, TMAs are much faster than the previous methods, but still run in time that is exponential in n. Roughly, this is achieved by fixing a width (in the diagonal case, a diagonal width), and counting polyominoes that fit in rectangles of that width. If this is done, it is only necessary to keep track of a polyomino's boundary, and since multiple polyominoes can correspond to a single boundary, this approach is faster than one generating every polyomino. Repeating this for every width gives every polyomino.

Although it has excellent running time, the tradeoff is that this algorithm uses exponential amounts of memory (many gigabytes of memory are needed for n above 50), is much harder to program than the other methods, and cannot currently be used to count free polyominoes.

=== Asymptotic growth of the number of polyominoes ===
==== Fixed polyominoes ====
Theoretical arguments and numerical calculations support the estimate for the number of fixed polyominoes of size n

$$A_n \sim \frac{c \lambda^n}{n}$$

where λ = 4.0626 and c = 0.3169. However, this result is not proven and the values of λ and c are only estimates.

The known theoretical results are not nearly as specific as this estimate. It has been proven that

$$\lim_{n \rightarrow \infty} (A_n)^\frac{1}{n} = \lambda$$

exists. In other words, A_{n} grows exponentially. The best known lower bound for λ, found in 2016, is 4.00253. The best known upper bound is λ < 4.5252.

To establish a lower bound, a simple but highly effective method is concatenation of polyominoes. Define the upper-right square to be the rightmost square in the uppermost row of the polyomino. Define the bottom-left square similarly. Then, the upper-right square of any polyomino of size n can be attached to the bottom-left square of any polyomino of size m to produce a unique (n+m)-omino. This proves A_{n}·A_{m} ≤ A_{n+m}. Using this inequality, one can show λ ≥ (A_{n})^{1/n} for all n. Refinements of this procedure combined with data for A_{n} produce the lower bound given above.

The upper bound is attained by generalizing the inductive method of enumerating polyominoes. Instead of adding one square at a time, one adds a cluster of squares at a time. This is often described as adding twigs. By proving that every n-omino is a sequence of twigs, and by proving limits on the combinations of possible twigs, one obtains an upper bound on the number of n-ominoes. For example, in the algorithm outlined above, at each step we must choose a larger number, and at most three new numbers are added (since at most three unnumbered squares are adjacent to any numbered square). This can be used to obtain an upper bound of 6.75. Using 2.8 million twigs, Klarner and Rivest obtained an upper bound of 4.65, which was subsequently improved by Barequet and Shalah to 4.5252.

==== Free polyominoes ====
Approximations for the number of fixed polyominoes and free polyominoes are related in a simple way. A free polyomino with no symmetries (rotation or reflection) corresponds to 8 distinct fixed polyominoes, and for large n, most n-ominoes have no symmetries. Therefore, the number of fixed n-ominoes is approximately 8 times the number of free n-ominoes. Moreover, this approximation is exponentially more accurate as n increases.

=== Special classes of polyominoes ===
Exact formulas are known for enumerating polyominoes of special classes, such as the class of convex polyominoes and the class of directed polyominoes.

The definition of a convex polyomino is different from the usual definition of convexity, but is similar to the definition used for the orthogonal convex hull. A polyomino is said to be vertically or column convex if its intersection with any vertical line is convex (in other words, each column has no holes). Similarly, a polyomino is said to be horizontally or row convex if its intersection with any horizontal line is convex. A polyomino is said to be convex if it is row and column convex.

A polyomino is said to be directed if it contains a square, known as the root, such that every other square can be reached by movements of up or right one square, without leaving the polyomino.

Directed polyominoes, column (or row) convex polyominoes, and convex polyominoes have been effectively enumerated by area n, as well as by some other parameters such as perimeter, using generating functions.

A polyomino is equable if its area equals its perimeter. An equable polyomino must be made from an even number of squares; every even number greater than 15 is possible. For instance, the 16-omino in the form of a 4 × 4 square and the 18-omino in the form of a 3 × 6 rectangle are both equable. For polyominoes with 15 squares or fewer, the perimeter always exceeds the area.

== Tiling with polyominoes ==
In recreational mathematics, challenges are often posed for tiling a prescribed region, or the entire plane, with polyominoes, and related problems are investigated in mathematics and computer science.

=== Tiling regions with sets of polyominoes ===
Puzzles commonly ask for tiling a given region with a given set of polyominoes, such as the 12 pentominoes. Golomb's and Gardner's books have many examples. A typical puzzle is to tile a 6×10 rectangle with the twelve pentominoes; the 2339 solutions to this were found in 1960. Where multiple copies of the polyominoes in the set are allowed, Golomb defines a hierarchy of different regions that a set may be able to tile, such as rectangles, strips, and the whole plane, and shows that whether polyominoes from a given set can tile the plane is undecidable, by mapping sets of Wang tiles to sets of polyominoes.

Because the general problem of tiling regions of the plane with sets of polyominoes is NP-complete, tiling with more than a few pieces rapidly becomes intractable and so the aid of a computer is required. The traditional approach to tiling finite regions of the plane uses a technique in computer science called backtracking. An alternative algebraic approach assigns a binary variable to each possible tile placement, so that the requirements of a valid tiling—including covering every cell exactly once and satisfying any specified constraints on tile use—can be formulated as a binary integer linear programming problem and solved using general-purpose optimization software.

In Jigsaw Sudoku a square grid is tiled with polyomino-shaped regions (sequence A172477 in the OEIS).

=== Tiling regions with copies of a single polyomino ===
Another class of problems asks whether copies of a given polyomino can tile a rectangle, and if so, what rectangles they can tile. These problems have been extensively studied for particular polyominoes, and tables of results for individual polyominoes are available. Klarner and Göbel showed that for any polyomino there is a finite set of prime rectangles it tiles, such that all other rectangles it tiles can be tiled by those prime rectangles. Kamenetsky and Cooke showed how various disjoint (called "holey") polyominoes can tile rectangles.

Beyond rectangles, Golomb gave his hierarchy for single polyominoes: a polyomino may tile a rectangle, a half strip, a bent strip, an enlarged copy of itself, a quadrant, a strip, a half plane, the whole plane, certain combinations, or none of these. There are certain implications among these, both obvious (for example, if a polyomino tiles the half plane then it tiles the whole plane) and less so (for example, if a polyomino tiles an enlarged copy of itself, then it tiles the quadrant). Polyominoes of size up to 6 are characterized in this hierarchy (with the status of one hexomino, later found to tile a rectangle, unresolved at that time).

In 2001 Cristopher Moore and John Michael Robson showed that the problem of tiling one polyomino with copies of another is NP-complete.

=== Tiling the plane with copies of a single polyomino ===
The two tiling nonominoes not satisfying the Conway criterion.

Tiling the plane with copies of a single polyomino has also been much discussed. It was noted in 1965 that all polyominoes up to hexominoes and all but four heptominoes tile the plane. It was then established by David Bird that all but 26 octominoes tile the plane. Rawsthorne found that all but 235 polyominoes of size 9 tile, and such results have been extended to higher area by Rhoads (to size 14) and others. Polyominoes tiling the plane have been classified by the symmetries of their tilings and by the number of aspects (orientations) in which the tiles appear in them.

The study of which polyominoes can tile the plane has been facilitated using the Conway criterion: except for two nonominoes, all tiling polyominoes up to size 9 form a patch of at least one tile satisfying it, with higher-size exceptions more frequent.

Several polyominoes can tile larger copies of themselves, and repeating this process recursively gives a rep-tile tiling of the plane. For instance, for every positive integer n, it is possible to combine n^{2} copies of the L-tromino, L-tetromino, or P-pentomino into a single larger shape similar to the smaller polyomino from which it was formed.

=== Tiling a common figure with various polyominoes ===
A minimal compatibility figure for the T and W pentominoes.

The compatibility problem is to take two or more polyominoes and find a figure that can be tiled with each. Polyomino compatibility has been widely studied since the 1990s. Jorge Luis Mireles and Giovanni Resta have published websites of systematic results, and Livio Zucca shows results for some complicated cases like three different pentominoes. The general problem can be hard. The first compatibility figure for the L and X pentominoes was published in 2005 and had 80 tiles of each kind. Many pairs of polyominoes have been proved incompatible by systematic exhaustion. No algorithm is known for deciding whether two arbitrary polyominoes are compatible.

== Polyominoes in puzzles and games ==
In addition to the tiling problems described above, there are recreational mathematics puzzles that require folding a polyomino to create other shapes. Gardner proposed several simple games with a set of free pentominoes and a chessboard. Some variants of the Sudoku puzzle use nonomino-shaped regions on the grid. The video game Tetris is based on the seven one-sided tetrominoes (spelled "Tetriminos" in the game), and the board game Blokus uses all of the free polyominoes up to pentominoes.

== Etymology ==
The word polyomino and the names of the various sizes of polyomino are all back-formations from the word domino, a common game piece consisting of two squares. The name domino for the game piece is believed to come from the spotted masquerade garment domino, from Latin dominus. Despite this word origin, in naming polyominoes, the first letter d- of domino is fancifully interpreted as a version of the prefix di- meaning "two", and replaced by other numerical prefixes.

== See also ==
- Percolation theory, the mathematical study of random subsets of integer grids. The finite connected components of these subsets form polyominoes.
- Young diagram, a special kind of polyomino used in number theory to describe integer partitions and in group theory and applications in mathematical physics to describe representations of the symmetric group.
- Blokus, a board game using polyominoes.
- Squaregraph, a kind of undirected graph including as a special case the graphs of vertices and edges of polyominoes.
- Polycube, its analogue in three dimensions.
