= Mutilated chessboard problem =

On domino tiling after removing two corners

The mutilated chessboard

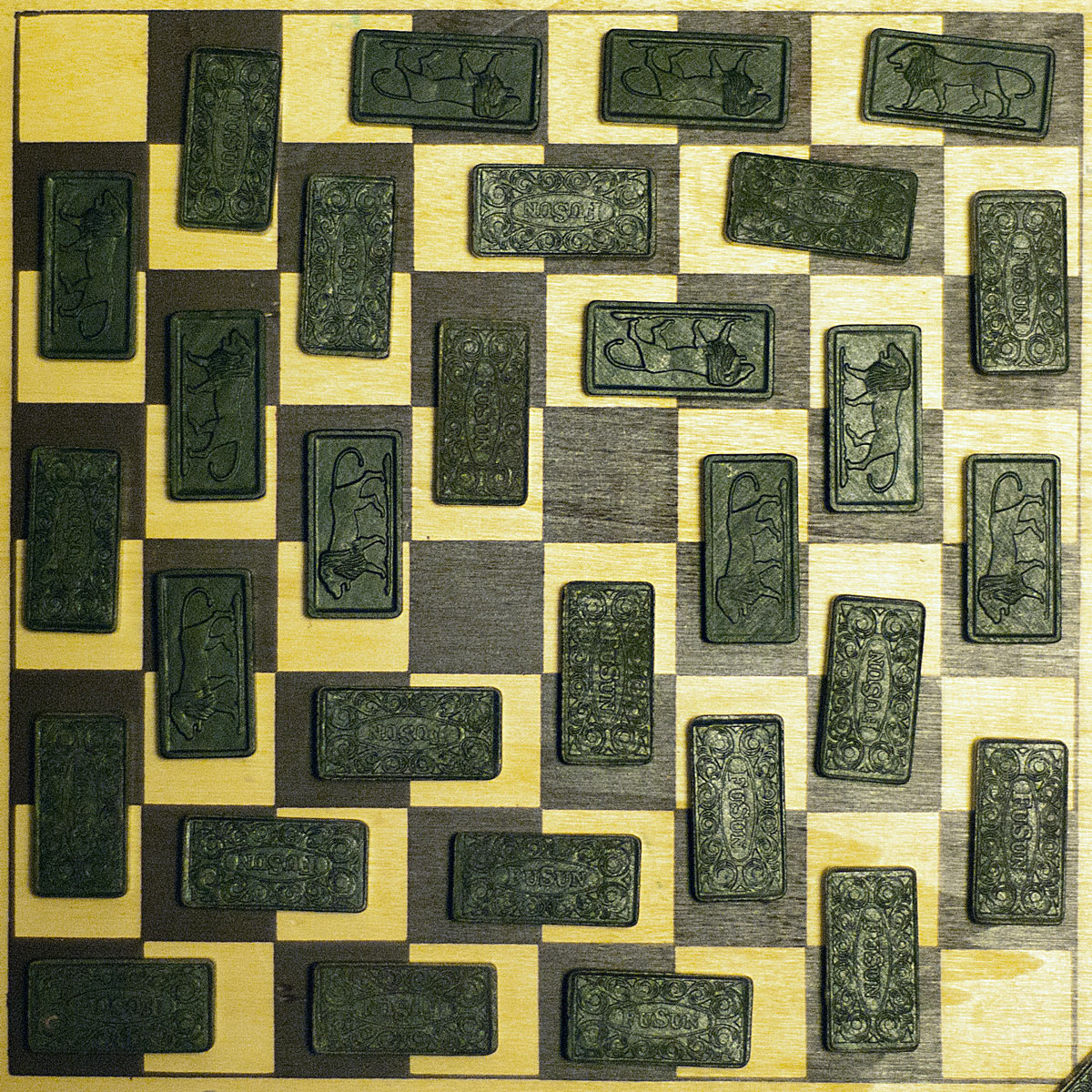
Unsuccessful solution to the mutilated chessboard problem: as well as the two corners, two center squares remain uncovered.

The mutilated chessboard problem is a tiling puzzle posed by Max Black in 1946 that asks:

Suppose a standard 8×8 chessboard (or checkerboard) has two diagonally opposite corners removed, leaving 62 squares. Is it possible to place 31 dominoes of size 2×1 so as to cover all of these squares?

It is an impossible puzzle: there is no domino tiling meeting these conditions. One proof of its impossibility uses the fact that, with the corners removed, the chessboard has 32 squares of one color and 30 of the other, but each domino must cover equally many squares of each color. More generally, if any two squares are removed from the chessboard, the rest can be tiled by dominoes if and only if the removed squares are of different colors. This problem has been used as a test case for automated reasoning, creativity, and the philosophy of mathematics.

== History ==
The mutilated chessboard problem is an instance of domino tiling of grids and polyominoes, also known as "dimer models", a general class of problems whose study in statistical mechanics dates to the work of Ralph H. Fowler and George Stanley Rushbrooke in 1937. Domino tilings also have a long history of practical use in pavement design and the arrangement of tatami flooring.

The mutilated chessboard problem itself was proposed by philosopher Max Black in his book Critical Thinking (1946), with a hint at the coloring-based solution to its impossibility. It was popularized in the 1950s through later discussions by Solomon W. Golomb (1954), George Gamow and Marvin Stern (1958), Claude Berge (1958), and Martin Gardner in his Scientific American column "Mathematical Games" (1957).

The use of the mutilated chessboard problem in automated reasoning stems from a proposal for its use by John McCarthy in 1964. It has also been studied in cognitive science as a test case for creative insight, Black's original motivation for the problem. In the philosophy of mathematics, it has been examined in studies of the nature of mathematical proof.

== Solution ==
The puzzle is impossible to complete. A domino placed on the chessboard will always cover one white square and one black square. Therefore, any collection of dominoes placed on the board will cover equal numbers of squares of each color. But any two opposite squares have the same color: both black or both white. If they are removed, there will be fewer squares of that color and more of the other color, making the numbers of squares of each color unequal and the board impossible to cover. The same idea shows that no domino tiling can exist whenever any two squares of the same color (not just the opposite corners) are removed from the chessboard.

Several other proofs of impossibility have also been found. A proof by Shmuel Winograd starts with induction. In a given tiling of the board, if a row has an odd number of squares not covered by vertical dominoes from the previous row, then an odd number of vertical dominoes must extend into the next row. The first row trivially has an odd number of squares (namely, 7) not covered by dominoes of the previous row. Thus, by induction, each of the seven pairs of consecutive rows houses an odd number of vertical dominoes, producing an odd total number. By the same reasoning, the total number of horizontal dominoes must also be odd. As the sum of two odd numbers, the total number of dominoes—vertical and horizontal—must be even. But to cover the mutilated chessboard, 31 dominoes are needed, an odd number. Another method counts the edges of each color around the boundary of the mutilated chessboard. Their numbers must be equal in any tileable region of the chessboard, because each domino has three edges of each color, and each internal edge between dominoes pairs off boundaries of opposite colors. However, the mutilated chessboard has more edges of one color than the other.

Gomory's theorem: Removing any two oppositely-colored squares of a chessboard leaves a region that can be tiled by dominoes. The two removed squares partition a Hamiltonian cycle through the squares into one (left) or two (right) paths through an even number of squares, allowing the modified chessboard to be tiled by dominoes laid along the paths.

A region of the chessboard that has no domino tiling, but for which coloring-based impossibility proofs do not work

If two squares of opposite colors are removed, then the remaining board can always be tiled with dominoes; this result is Gomory's theorem, after mathematician Ralph E. Gomory, whose proof was published in 1973. Gomory's theorem can be proven using a Hamiltonian cycle of the grid graph formed by the chessboard squares. The removal of any two oppositely colored squares splits this cycle into two paths with an even number of squares each. Both of these paths are easy to partition into dominoes by following them. Gomory's theorem is specific to the removal of only one square of each color. Removing larger numbers of squares, with equal numbers of each color, can result in a region that has no domino tiling, but for which coloring-based impossibility proofs do not work.

== Application to automated reasoning ==
Domino tiling problems on polyominoes, such as the mutilated chessboard problem, can be solved in polynomial time, either by converting them into problems in group theory, or as instances of bipartite matching. In the latter formulation, one obtains a bipartite graph with a vertex for each available chessboard square and an edge for every pair of adjacent squares; the problem is to find a system of edges that touches each vertex exactly once. As in the coloring-based proof of the impossibility of the mutilated chessboard problem, the fact that this graph has more vertices of one color than the other implies that it fails the necessary conditions of Hall's marriage theorem, so no matching exists. The problem can also be solved by formulating it as a constraint satisfaction problem, and applying semidefinite programming to a relaxation.

In 1964, John McCarthy proposed the mutilated chessboard as a hard problem for automated proof systems, formulating it in first-order logic and asking for a system that can automatically determine the unsolvability of this formulation. Most considerations of this problem provide solutions "in the conceptual sense" that do not apply to McCarthy's logic formulation of the problem. Despite the existence of general methods such as those based on graph matching, it is exponentially hard for resolution to solve McCarthy's logical formulation of the problem, highlighting the need for methods in artificial intelligence that can automatically change to a more suitable problem representation and for knowledge representation systems that can manage the equivalences between different representations. Short proofs are possible using resolution with additional variables, or in stronger proof systems allowing the expression of avoidable tiling patterns that can prune the search space. Higher-level proof assistants are capable of handling the coloring-based impossibility proof directly; these include Isabelle, the Mizar system, and Nqthm.

== Related problems ==
For this coloring of a 6 × 6 × 6 cube, each 1 × 2 × 4 cuboid occupies two black and two white small cubes. However, the 6 × 6 × 6 cube has more white than black small cubes, so (as De Bruijn's theorem states) it cannot be fully packed with 1 × 2 × 4 cuboids

Position: a8 black upside-down rook, h1 white circle

Wazir's tour problem

A similar problem asks if a wazir starting at a corner square of an ordinary chessboard can visit every square exactly once, and finish at the opposite corner square. The wazir is a fairy chess piece that can move only one square vertically or horizontally (not diagonally). Using similar reasoning to the mutilated chessboard problem's classic solution, this wazir's tour does not exist. For example, if the initial square is white, as each move alternates between black and white squares, the final square of any complete tour is black. However, the opposite corner square is white.

Similarly, there are no knight's tours from one corner to the opposite corner, as knights also alternate colours on each move.

This sort of tour of a chessboard also forms the basis of a type of puzzle called Numbrix, which asks for a tour in which the positions of certain squares match given clues. The impossibility of a corner-to-corner tour shows the impossibility of a Numbrix puzzle with the clues 1 in one corner and 64 in the opposite corner.

De Bruijn's theorem concerns the impossibility of packing certain cuboids into a larger cuboid. For instance, it is impossible, according to this theorem, to fill a 6 × 6 × 6 box with 1 × 2 × 4 cuboids. The proof uses a similar chessboard-coloring argument to the mutilated chessboard problem.
