= Conway criterion =

Rule from the theory of the tiling of the plane

Prototile Octagon satisfying the Conway criterion. Sections AB and ED are shown in red, and the remaining segments are shown in color with a dot on the point of centrosymmetry.

A tessellation of the above prototile meeting the Conway criterion.

In the mathematical theory of tessellations, the Conway criterion, named for the English mathematician John Horton Conway, is a sufficient rule for when a prototile will tile the plane. It consists of the following requirements: The tile must be a closed topological disk with six consecutive points A, B, C, D, E, and F on the boundary such that:

- the boundary part from A to B is congruent to the boundary part from E to D by a translation T where T(A) = E and T(B) = D.
- each of the boundary parts BC, CD, EF, and FA is centrosymmetric—that is, each one is congruent to itself when rotated by 180-degrees around its midpoint.
- some of the six points may coincide but at least three of them must be distinct.

Any prototile satisfying Conway's criterion admits a periodic tiling of the plane—and does so using only 180-degree rotations. The Conway criterion is a sufficient condition to prove that a prototile tiles the plane but not a necessary one. There are tiles that fail the criterion and still tile the plane.

Every Conway tile is foldable into either an isotetrahedron or a rectangle dihedron and conversely, every net of an isotetrahedron or rectangle dihedron is a Conway tile.

== History ==
The Conway criterion applies to any shape that is a closed disk—if the boundary of such a shape satisfies the criterion, then it will tile the plane. Although the graphic artist M.C. Escher never articulated the criterion, he discovered it in the mid-1920s. One of his earliest tessellations, later numbered 1 by him, illustrates his understanding of the conditions in the criterion. Six of his earliest tessellations all satisfy the criterion. In 1963 the German mathematician Heinrich Heesch described the five types of tiles that satisfy the criterion. He shows each type with notation that identifies the edges of a tile as one travels around the boundary: CCC, CCCC, TCTC, TCTCC, TCCTCC, where C means a centrosymmetric edge, and T means a translated edge.

Conway was likely inspired by Martin Gardner's July 1975 column in Scientific American that discussed which convex polygons can tile the plane. In August 1975, Gardner revealed that Conway had discovered his criterion while trying to find an efficient way to determine which of the 108 heptominoes tile the plane.

== Examples ==
Example tessellation based on a Type 1 hexagonal tile.

In its simplest form, the criterion simply states that any hexagon with a pair of opposite sides that are parallel and congruent will tessellate the plane. In Gardner's article, this is called a type 1 hexagon. This is also true of parallelograms. But the translations that match the opposite edges of these tiles are the composition of two 180° rotations—about the midpoints of two adjacent edges in the case of a hexagonal parallelogon, and about the midpoint of an edge and one of its vertices in the case of a parallelogram. When a tile that satisfies the Conway Criterion is rotated 180° about the midpoint of a centrosymmetric edge, it creates either a generalized parallelogram or a generalized hexagonal parallelogon (these have opposite edges congruent and parallel), so the doubled tile can tile the plane by translations. The translations are the composition of 180° rotations just as in the case of the straight-edge hexagonal parallelogon or parallelograms.

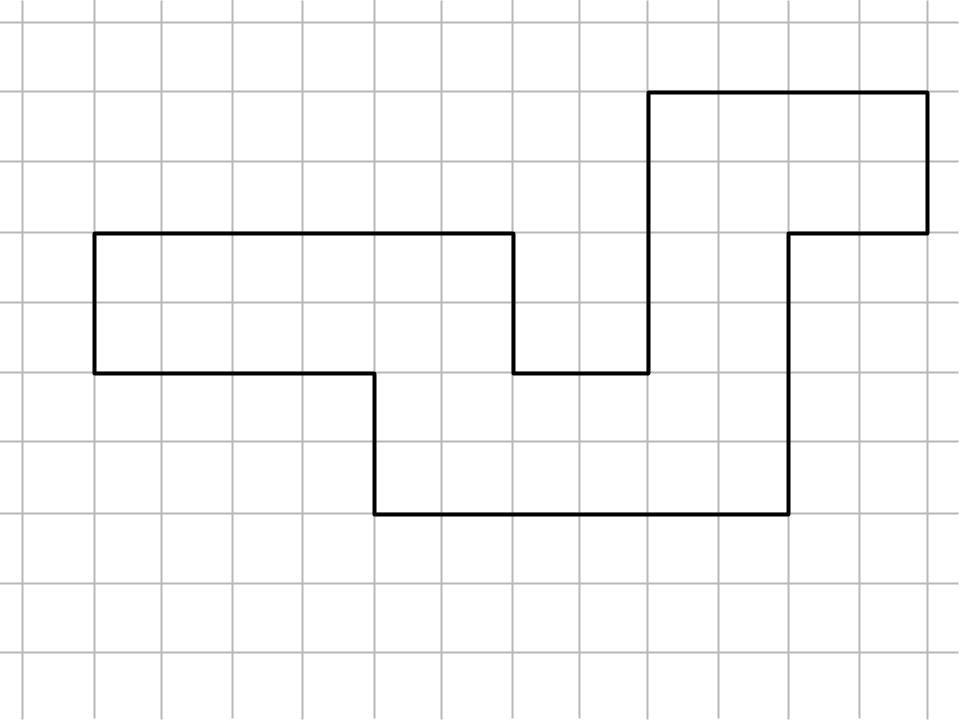
A tiling nonomino that does not satisfy the Conway criterion.

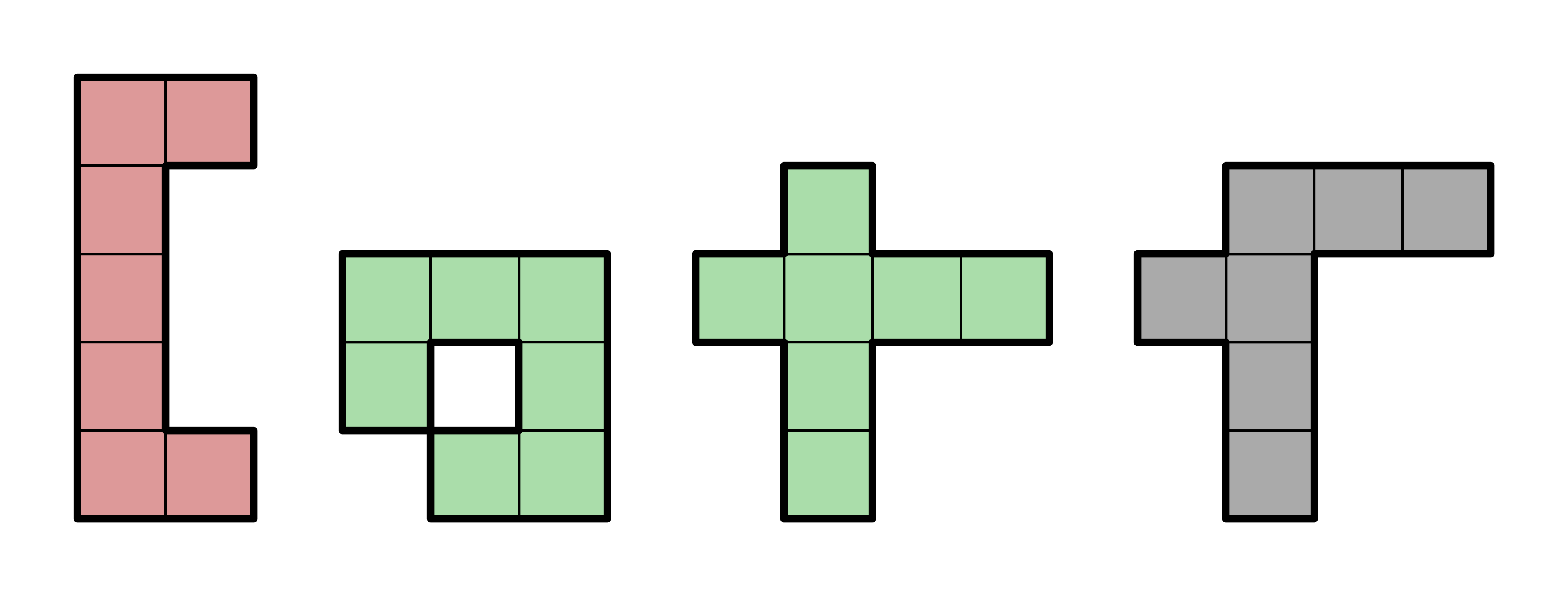
The four heptominoes incapable of tiling the plane, including the one heptomino with a hole.

The Conway criterion is surprisingly powerful—especially when applied to polyforms. With the exception of four heptominoes, all polyominoes up through order 7 either satisfy the Conway criterion or two copies can form a patch which satisfies the criterion. Except for two nonominoes, all tiling polyominoes up to size 9 form a patch of at least one tile satisfying it, with higher-size exceptions more frequent.
