= Solomon W. Golomb =

American mathematician (1932–2016)

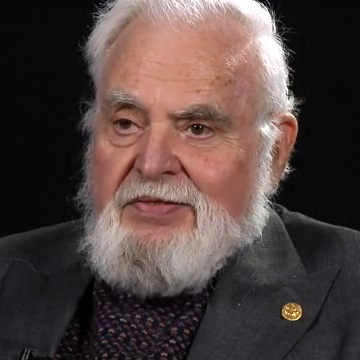
- Born: Solomon Wolf Golomb; May 30, 1932; Baltimore, Maryland, U.S.
- Died: May 1, 2016 (aged 83); Los Angeles, California, U.S.
- Education: Johns Hopkins University; Harvard University
- Awards: Claude E. Shannon Award (1985); IEEE Richard W. Hamming Medal (2000); National Medal of Science (2011)
- Scientific career
- Fields: Mathematics, engineering
- Workplaces: University of Southern California
- Doctoral advisor: David Widder

Solomon Wolf Golomb (/ɡəˈloʊm/ gə-LOHM; May 30, 1932 – May 1, 2016) was an American mathematician, engineer, and professor of electrical engineering at the University of Southern California, best known for his works on mathematical games. He most notably invented Cheskers (a hybrid between chess and checkers) in 1948. He also fully described polyominoes in 1953. He specialized in problems of combinatorial analysis, number theory, coding theory, and communications. Pentomino board games, based on his work, would go on to inspire Tetris.

== Achievements ==
Golomb, a Baltimore City College high school graduate, received his bachelor's degree from Johns Hopkins University and master's and doctorate in mathematics from Harvard University in 1957. His dissertation was "Problems in the Distribution of the Prime Numbers."

While working at the Glenn L. Martin Company, he became interested in communications theory and began working on shift register sequences. He spent his Fulbright year at the University of Oslo and then joined the Jet Propulsion Laboratory at Caltech, where he researched military and space communications. He joined the faculty of USC in 1963 and was awarded full tenure two years later.

Golomb pioneered the identification of the characteristics and merits of maximum length shift register sequences, also known as pseudorandom or pseudonoise sequences, which have extensive military, industrial, and consumer applications. Today, millions of cordless and cellular phones employ pseudorandom direct-sequence spread spectrum implemented with shift register sequences. His efforts made USC a center for communications research.

Golomb was the inventor of Golomb coding, a form of entropy encoding. Golomb rulers, used in astronomy and data encryption, are also named for him, as is one of the main generation techniques of Costas arrays, the Lempel-Golomb generation method.

He was a regular columnist, writing Golomb's Puzzle Column in the IEEE Information Society Newsletter. He was also a frequent contributor to Scientific American's Mathematical Games column (The column did much to publicize his discoveries about polyominoes and pentominoes) and a frequent participant in Gathering 4 Gardner conferences. Among his contributions to recreational mathematics are Rep-tiles. He also contributed a puzzle to each issue of the Johns Hopkins Magazine, a monthly publication of his undergraduate alma mater, for a column called "Golomb's Gambits," and was a frequent contributor to Word Ways: The Journal of Recreational Linguistics.

== Awards ==
Golomb was a member of the National Academy of Engineering and the National Academy of Sciences.

In 1985, he received the Shannon Award of the Information Theory Society of the IEEE.

In 1992, he received the U.S. National Security Agency medal for his research. He has also received the Lomonosov Medal of the Russian Academy of Science and the Kapitsa Medal of the Russian Academy of Natural Sciences.

In 2000, he was awarded the IEEE Richard W. Hamming Medal for his exceptional contributions to information sciences and systems. For over four decades, he was singled out as a major figure in coding and information theory, specifically for his ability to apply advanced mathematics to problems in digital communications.

In 2012, he became a fellow of the American Mathematical Society. That same year, it was announced that he had been selected to receive the National Medal of Science. In 2014, he was elected as a fellow of the Society for Industrial and Applied Mathematics "for contributions to coding theory, data encryption, communications, and mathematical games."

In 2013, he was awarded the National Medal of Science 2011.

In 2016, he was awarded the Benjamin Franklin Medal in Electrical Engineering "for pioneering work in space communications and the design of digital spread spectrum signals, transmissions that provide security, interference suppression, and precise location for cryptography; missile guidance; defense, space, and cellular communications; radar; sonar; and GPS."

== Selected books ==
- Golomb, Solomon; Gong, Guang (2005). Signal Design for Good Correlation. Cambridge University Press. ISBN 0-521-82104-5.
- Golomb, Solomon (1996). Polyominoes (2nd ed.). Princeton University Press. ISBN 0-691-02444-8.
- Golomb, Solomon (2017). Shift Register Sequences (3rd ed.). World Scientific. doi:10.1142/9361. ISBN 978-981-4632-00-3.
- Golomb, Beatrice; Gong, Guang; Hales, Alfred, eds. (2023). The Wisdom of Solomon: The Genius and Legacy of Solomon Golomb. World Scientific. doi:10.1142/12211. ISBN 978-981-123-436-1. This book contains some previously hard-to-find works of Solomon Golomb.

== See also ==
- Golomb graph
- Golomb sequence
- Polyomino
