= Domino (mathematics) =

Geometric shape formed from two squares

The single free domino

In mathematics, a domino is a polyomino of order 2, that is, a polygon in the plane made of two equal-sized squares connected edge-to-edge, and a 1x2 rectangle. When rotations and reflections are not considered to be distinct shapes, there is only one free domino.

Since it has reflection symmetry, it is also the only one-sided domino (with reflections considered distinct). When rotations are also considered distinct, there are two fixed dominoes: The second one can be created by rotating the one above by 90°.

In a wider sense, the term domino is sometimes understood to mean a tile of any shape.

== Packing and tiling ==
Dominos can tile the plane in a countably infinite number of ways. The number of tilings of a 2×n rectangle with dominoes is $F_n$, the nth Fibonacci number.

Domino tilings figure in several celebrated problems, including the Aztec diamond problem in which large diamond-shaped regions have a number of tilings equal to a power of two, with most tilings appearing random within a central circular region and having a more regular structure outside of this "arctic circle", and the mutilated chessboard problem, in which removing two opposite corners from a chessboard makes it impossible to tile with dominoes.

== See also ==
- Dominoes, a set of domino-shaped gaming pieces
- Tatami, Japanese domino-shaped floor mats
