= William Kolakoski =

American artist and recreational mathematician

William George Kolakoski
- Self-portrait by William Kolakoski
- Born: September 17, 1944; Pittsburgh, Pennsylvania, U.S.
- Died: July 26, 1997 (aged 52); Fairmont, West Virginia, U.S.
- Education: Carnegie Institute of Technology
- Known for: Abstract art, Portraits, Kolakoski sequence

William George Kolakoski (September 17, 1944 – July 26, 1997), known as Bill to family and friends, was an American artist and recreational mathematician who is most famous for devising and giving his name to the Kolakoski sequence, a self-generating sequence of integers that has been extensively studied by mathematicians since he first described it in the American Mathematical Monthly in 1965.

== Life and education ==
Kolakoski was born September 17, 1944, in Pittsburgh, Pennsylvania, the son of George Leon Kolakoski and his wife Eleanor (née Gale). He had many interests as a boy, including art, philosophy and mathematics, but chose to study fine art at the Carnegie Institute of Technology (CIT) (now Carnegie Mellon University) because he felt that, while he could study mathematics and philosophy independently, he needed the support of others to make a career in art. His fellow students were struck by his sharp intelligence, breadth of knowledge and skills in many different fields, including the ability to play good chess without making a particular study of the game.

He graduated from CIT with honors as a Bachelor of Fine Arts in painting in 1967 and worked for a time at United States Steel as a draftsman. However, because he had schizophrenia and had to take constant medication to avoid psychosis and delusions, he was unable to keep in steady employment or to develop his artistic career as he wanted. He eventually moved to West Virginia, where he met his wife Loretta and found a position as an artist-in-residence in Fairmont. In 1996, he was diagnosed with lung cancer and he died July 26, 1997, at the Fairmont General Hospital.

== The Kolakoski sequence ==
=== Definition of sequence ===
This sequence of integers was first discussed by the professional mathematician Rufus Oldenburger in 1939, but attracted little attention at that time. It consists of an infinite series of 1s and 2s that begins like this:

1,2,2,1,1,2,1,2,2,1,2,2,1,1,2,1,1,2,2,1,2,1,1,2,1,2,2,1,1,... (sequence A000002 in the OEIS)

Each symbol occurs in a "run" of either one or two consecutive terms and writing down the lengths of these runs gives exactly the same sequence:

1,2,2,1,1,2,1,2,2,1,2,2,1,1,2,1,1,2,2,1,2,1,1,2,1,2,2,1,1,2,1,1,2,1,2,2,1,2,2,1,1,2,1,2,2,...

1, 2 , 2 ,1,1, 2 ,1, 2 , 2 ,1, 2 , 2 ,1,1, 2 ,1,1, 2 , 2 ,1, 2 ,1,1, 2 ,1, 2 , 2 ,1,1, 2 ,...

Conversely, one can say that each term of the Kolakoski sequence generates a run of one or two future terms. The first 1 of the sequence generates a run of "1", i.e. itself; the first 2 generates a run of "22", which includes itself; the second 2 generates a run of "11"; and so on. This animation illustrates the process:

An animated gif illustrating how later terms of the Kolakoski sequence are generated by earlier terms.

=== Kolakoski's role in popularizing the sequence ===
William Kolakoski devised the sequence independently of Oldenburger and introduced it to his fellow students while at the Carnegie Institute of Technology. He submitted it to the American Mathematical Monthly (AMM) and it was published as "Advanced Problem 5304" in the following form:

5304. Proposed by William Kolakoski, Carnegie Institute of Technology

Describe a simple rule for constructing the sequence

1 2 2 1 1 2 1 2 2 1 2 2 1 1 2 1 1 2 2 1 2 1 1 2 1 2 2 1 1 2 1 1 2 1 2 2 1 2 2 1 1...

What is the nth term? Is the sequence periodic? (AMM, Vol. 72, No. 6, June–July 1965)

It was then called the Kolakoski sequence as mathematicians investigated it further.

=== Analysis by mathematicians ===
Despite the simplicity with which the sequence can be described and generated, it poses several interesting and complex mathematical problems, some of which remain unsolved after more than fifty years of analysis. Until almost the end of his life, Kolakoski himself was not aware of how much attention it had received from professional mathematicians after he had published notice of it in the AMM. However, he eventually received a letter from an architect called William Huff that mentioned the sequence. The letter prompted Loretta Kolakoski to ask her husband's friend Mike Vargo, a writer who had first met him at CIT, to carry out further research when Kolakoski was in hospital during his final illness. Vargo discovered many references to the Kolakoski sequence on the internet and was able to inform his friend before Kolakoski died. Vargo felt that Kolakoski had been quietly pleased by the news, feeling that it vindicated his belief in the importance and beauty of the sequence.

== Personal significance of sequence to Kolakoski ==
Because he had schizophrenia, Kolakoski was preoccupied with the topics of free will and determinism throughout his life. Despite his high intelligence and ability to master many different skills with little effort, his illness was, in the words of Mike Vargo, "this thing living within him that was always threatening to literally take over his mind and transport it into regions of chaos and delusion." While wanting to feel himself free, Kolakoski was well aware that he could not control his own brain without pharmaceutical help and was forced to accept determinism. Vargo therefore deduced that his friend searched for a benevolent order in the universe, of which the Kolakoski sequence was one possible expression. The sequence is entirely deterministic, yet behaves in an unpredictable and strangely beautiful way. Kolakoski continued to explore the sequence for many years, creating a corpus of material that is now held as the William Kolakoski Collection at Carnegie Mellon University Libraries and overseen by the mathematician Clark Kimberling.
