= 1986 in science =

The year 1986 in science and technology involved many significant events, some not listed below.

== Astronomy and space exploration ==
- January 24 – NASA Voyager 2 space probe makes first encounter with Uranus.
- January 28 – NASA Space Shuttle Challenger explodes on launch, killing all seven astronauts aboard. Their bodies are located by United States Navy divers on March 9.
- February 19 – The Soviet Union launches the Mir space station.
- March 8 – Japanese spacecraft Suisei flies by Halley's Comet, studying its UV hydrogen corona and solar wind.
- October 10 – Aten asteroid 3753 Cruithne, in co-orbital configuration with Earth, is identified by Duncan Waldron.

== Biology ==
- May – First reported methods for constructing a monoclonal antibody containing parts from mouse and human antibodies, a required first step toward the development of humanized antibodies used later as medical therapeutics (such as Infliximab).
- English epidemiologist David Barker proposes his fetal origins hypothesis.

== Computer science ==
- January 16 – The Internet Engineering Task Force, a standards organization that develops and promotes Internet standards, holds its first meeting, consisting of 21 United States government-funded researchers.
- January 19 – The first MS-DOS-based personal computer virus, Brain, starts to spread.
- April 3 – IBM unveils the PC Convertible, the first laptop computer.
- June 23 – Eric Thomas develops LISTSERV, the first email list management software.
- Internet Message Access Protocol (IMAP) is visualized by Mark Crispin.
- 3D printing is developed by Charles Hull.
- Pixar is founded.

== Mathematics ==
- Summer – Kenneth Alan Ribet demonstrates proof of the ε-conjecture, subsequently known as Ribet's theorem confirming Gerhard Frey's suggestion that the Taniyama–Shimura conjecture implies Fermat's Last Theorem.
- Lawrence Paulson makes the first release of Isabelle (proof assistant).
- Lee Sallows introduces the alphamagic square.

== Technology ==
- January 11 – The Gateway Bridge is opened in Brisbane, Australia, the world's largest prestressed concrete single box bridge.
- April 26 – Chernobyl disaster: An RBMK at Chernobyl Nuclear Power Plant in the Ukrainian Soviet Socialist Republic reaches prompt criticality.
- December 23 – Rutan Voyager becomes the first aircraft to fly around the world without stopping or refueling, landing at Edwards Air Force Base in California after a nine-day trip piloted by Dick Rutan and Jeana Yeager.

== Awards ==
- Crafoord Prize in Geosciences: Gerald Wasserburg and Claude Jean Allègre
- Fields Prize in Mathematics: Simon Donaldson, Gerd Faltings and Michael Freedman
- Nobel Prizes
  - Physics – Ernst Ruska, Gerd Binnig, Heinrich Rohrer
  - Chemistry – Dudley R. Herschbach, Yuan T. Lee, John C. Polanyi
  - Medicine – Stanley Cohen, Rita Levi-Montalcini
- Turing Award – John Hopcroft, Robert Tarjan
- Wollaston Medal for Geology – Claude Jean Allègre

== Births ==
- November 8 – Aaron Swartz (suicide 2013), American computer programmer and Internet hactivist.

== Deaths ==
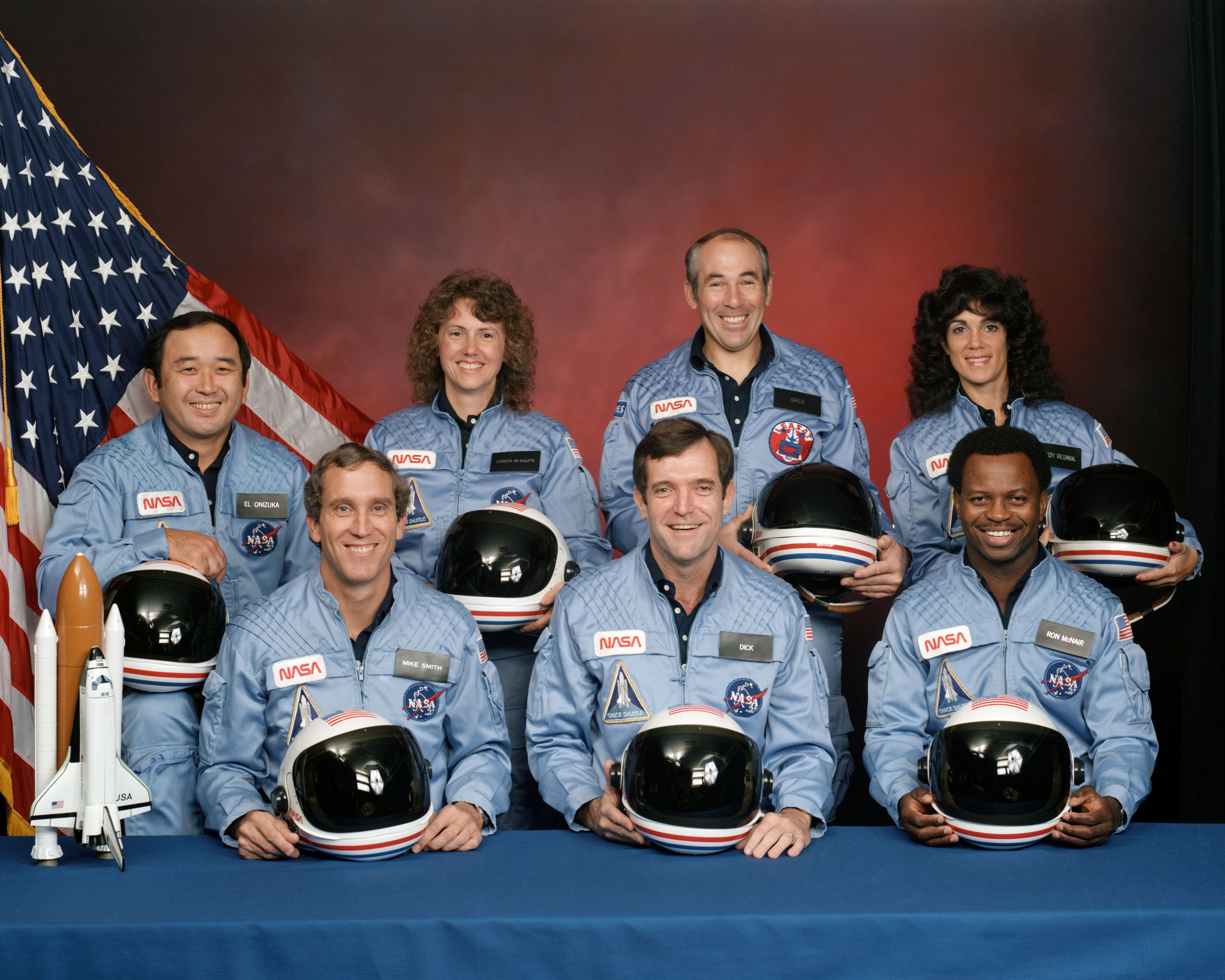
Crew of NASA Space Shuttle Challenger mission STS-51-L

- January 7 – Rex Wailes (b. 1901), English engineer and historian of technology.
- January 28
  - Crew of United States Space Shuttle Challenger mission STS-51-L:
    - Greg Jarvis (b. 1944)
    - Christa McAuliffe (b. 1948)
    - Ronald McNair (b. 1950)
    - Ellison Onizuka (b. 1946)
    - Judith Resnik (b. 1949)
    - Dick Scobee (b. 1939)
    - Michael J. Smith (b. 1945)
  - Dorothée Pullinger (b. 1894), French-born British production engineer.
- April 22 – Dame Honor Fell (b. 1900), English biologist.
- July 6 – William Rashkind (b. 1922), American cardiologist.
- July 21 – Zhang Yuzhe (b. 1902), Chinese astronomer.
- October 22 – Albert Szent-Györgyi (b. 1893), Hungarian physiologist, winner of the Nobel Prize in Physiology or Medicine.
- October 31 – Edward Adelbert Doisy (b. 1893), American biochemist, winner of the Nobel Prize in Physiology or Medicine.
- June 7 – Robert S. Mulliken (b. 1896), American physicist, winner of the Nobel Prize in Chemistry.
- November 25 – Sir Ivan Magill (b. 1888), British anesthesiologist.
