= Look-and-say sequence =

Integer sequence

The lines show the growth of the numbers of digits in the look-and-say sequences with starting points 23 (red), 1 (blue), 13 (violet), 312 (green). These lines (when represented in a logarithmic vertical scale) tend to straight lines whose slopes coincide with Conway's constant.

In mathematics, the look-and-say sequence is the sequence of integers beginning as follows:

1, 11, 21, 1211, 111221, 312211, 13112221, 1113213211, 31131211131221, ... (sequence A005150 in the OEIS).

To generate a member of the sequence from the previous member, read off the digits of the previous member, counting the number of digits in groups of the same digit. For example:

- 1 is read off as "one 1" or 11.
- 11 is read off as "two 1s" or 21.
- 21 is read off as "one 2, one 1" or 1211.
- 1211 is read off as "one 1, one 2, two 1s" or 111221.
- 111221 is read off as "three 1s, two 2s, one 1" or 312211.

The look-and-say sequence was analyzed by John Conway after he was introduced to it by one of his students at a party.

The idea of the look-and-say sequence is similar to that of run-length encoding.

If started with any digit d from 0 to 9 then d will remain indefinitely as the last digit of the sequence. For any d other than 1, the sequence starts as follows:

d, 1d, 111d, 311d, 13211d, 111312211d, 31131122211d, …

Ilan Vardi has called this sequence, starting with d = 3, the Conway sequence (sequence A006715 in the OEIS). (for d = 2, see (sequence A006751 in the OEIS))

== Basic properties ==
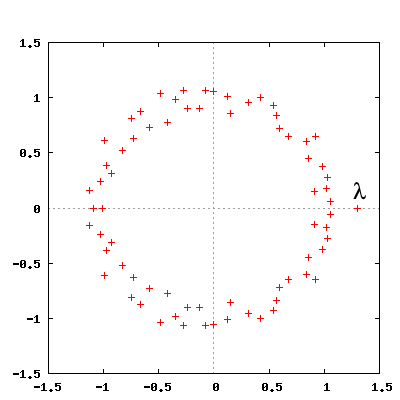
Roots of the Conway polynomial plotted in the complex plane. Conway's constant is marked with the Greek letter lambda (λ).

=== Growth ===
The sequence grows indefinitely. In fact, any variant defined by starting with a different integer seed number will (eventually) also grow indefinitely, except for the degenerate sequence: 22, 22, 22, 22, ... which remains the same size.

=== Digits presence limitation ===
No digits other than 1, 2, and 3 appear in the sequence, unless the seed number contains such a digit or a run of more than three of the same digit.

=== Cosmological decay ===
Conway's cosmological theorem asserts that every sequence eventually splits ("decays") into a sequence of "atomic elements", which are finite subsequences that never again interact with their neighbors. There are 92 elements containing the digits 1, 2, and 3 only, which John Conway named after the 92 naturally occurring chemical elements up to uranium, calling the sequence "audioactive." There are also two "transuranic" elements (Np and Pu) for each digit other than 1, 2, and 3. Below is a table of all such elements:

All "atomic elements" (Where E_{k} is included within the derivate of E_{k+1} except Np and Pu)
Atomic number (n)	Element name (E_{k})	Sequence	Decays into	Abundance
1	H	22	H	91790.383216
2	He	13112221133211322112211213322112	Hf.Pa.H.Ca.Li	3237.2968588
3	Li	312211322212221121123222112	He	4220.0665982
4	Be	111312211312113221133211322112211213322112	Ge.Ca.Li	2263.8860325
5	B	1321132122211322212221121123222112	Be	2951.1503716
6	C	3113112211322112211213322112	B	3847.0525419
7	N	111312212221121123222112	C	5014.9302464
8	O	132112211213322112	N	6537.3490750
9	F	31121123222112	O	8521.9396539
10	Ne	111213322112	F	11109.006696
11	Na	123222112	Ne	14481.448773
12	Mg	3113322112	Pm.Na	18850.441228
13	Al	1113222112	Mg	24573.006696
14	Si	1322112	Al	32032.812960
15	P	311311222112	Ho.Si	14895.886658
16	S	1113122112	P	19417.939250
17	Cl	132112	S	25312.784218
18	Ar	3112	Cl	32997.170122
19	K	1112	Ar	43014.360913
20	Ca	12	K	56072.543129
21	Sc	3113112221133112	Ho.Pa.H.Ca.Co	9302.0974443
22	Ti	11131221131112	Sc	12126.002783
23	V	13211312	Ti	15807.181592
24	Cr	31132	V	20605.882611
25	Mn	111311222112	Cr.Si	26861.360180
26	Fe	13122112	Mn	35015.858546
27	Co	32112	Fe	45645.877256
28	Ni	11133112	Zn.Co	13871.123200
29	Cu	131112	Ni	18082.082203
30	Zn	312	Cu	23571.391336
31	Ga	13221133122211332	Eu.Ca.Ac.H.Ca.Zn	1447.8905642
32	Ge	31131122211311122113222	Ho.Ga	1887.4372276
33	As	11131221131211322113322112	Ge.Na	27.246216076
34	Se	13211321222113222112	As	35.517547944
35	Br	3113112211322112	Se	46.299868152
36	Kr	11131221222112	Br	60.355455682
37	Rb	1321122112	Kr	78.678000089
38	Sr	3112112	Rb	102.56285249
39	Y	1112133	Sr.U	133.69860315
40	Zr	12322211331222113112211	Y.H.Ca.Tc	174.28645997
41	Nb	1113122113322113111221131221	Er.Zr	227.19586752
42	Mo	13211322211312113211	Nb	296.16736852
43	Tc	311322113212221	Mo	386.07704943
44	Ru	132211331222113112211	Eu.Ca.Tc	328.99480576
45	Rh	311311222113111221131221	Ho.Ru	428.87015041
46	Pd	111312211312113211	Rh	559.06537946
47	Ag	132113212221	Pd	728.78492056
48	Cd	3113112211	Ag	950.02745646
49	In	11131221	Cd	1238.4341972
50	Sn	13211	In	1614.3946687
51	Sb	3112221	Pm.Sn	2104.4881933
52	Te	1322113312211	Eu.Ca.Sb	2743.3629718
53	I	311311222113111221	Ho.Te	3576.1856107
54	Xe	11131221131211	I	4661.8342720
55	Cs	13211321	Xe	6077.0611889
56	Ba	311311	Cs	7921.9188284
57	La	11131	Ba	10326.833312
58	Ce	1321133112	La.H.Ca.Co	13461.825166
59	Pr	31131112	Ce	17548.529287
60	Nd	111312	Pr	22875.863883
61	Pm	132	Nd	29820.456167
62	Sm	311332	Pm.Ca.Zn	15408.115182
63	Eu	1113222	Sm	20085.668709
64	Gd	13221133112	Eu.Ca.Co	21662.972821
65	Tb	3113112221131112	Ho.Gd	28239.358949
66	Dy	111312211312	Tb	36812.186418
67	Ho	1321132	Dy	47987.529438
68	Er	311311222	Ho.Pm	1098.5955997
69	Tm	11131221133112	Er.Ca.Co	1204.9083841
70	Yb	1321131112	Tm	1570.6911808
71	Lu	311312	Yb	2047.5173200
72	Hf	11132	Lu	2669.0970363
73	Ta	13112221133211322112211213322113	Hf.Pa.H.Ca.W	242.07736666
74	W	312211322212221121123222113	Ta	315.56655252
75	Re	111312211312113221133211322112211213322113	Ge.Ca.W	169.28801808
76	Os	1321132122211322212221121123222113	Re	220.68001229
77	Ir	3113112211322112211213322113	Os	287.67344775
78	Pt	111312212221121123222113	Ir	375.00456738
79	Au	132112211213322113	Pt	488.84742982
80	Hg	31121123222113	Au	637.25039755
81	Tl	111213322113	Hg	830.70513293
82	Pb	123222113	Tl	1082.8883285
83	Bi	3113322113	Pm.Pb	1411.6286100
84	Po	1113222113	Bi	1840.1669683
85	At	1322113	Po	2398.7998311
86	Rn	311311222113	Ho.At	3127.0209328
87	Fr	1113122113	Rn	4076.3134078
88	Ra	132113	Fr	5313.7894999
89	Ac	3113	Ra	6926.9352045
90	Th	1113	Ac	7581.9047125
91	Pa	13	Th	9883.5986392
92	U	3	Pa	102.56285249
Transuranic elements
93	Np	1311222113321132211221121332211n (Note: n can be any digit 4 or above.)	Hf.Pa.H.Ca.Pu	0
94	Pu	31221132221222112112322211n	Np	0

=== Growth in length ===
The terms eventually grow in length by about 30% per generation. In particular, if L_{n} denotes the number of digits of the n-th member of the sequence, then the limit of the ratio $\frac{L_{n + 1}}{L_n}$ exists and is given by
$$\lim_{n \to \infty} \frac{L_{n+1}}{L_{n}} = \lambda$$

where λ = 1.303577269034... (sequence A014715 in the OEIS) is an algebraic number of degree 71. This fact was proven by Conway, and the constant λ is known as Conway's constant. The same result also holds for every variant of the sequence starting with any seed other than 22.

==== Conway's constant as a polynomial root ====
Conway's constant is the unique positive real root of the following polynomial (sequence A137275 in the OEIS):
$$\begin{matrix}
&           &\qquad            &           &\qquad            &           &\qquad            &            & +1x^{71}  &           \\
-1x^{69}  & -2x^{68}  &   -1x^{67}  & +2x^{66}  &  +2x^{65}  &  +1x^{64} &  -1x^{63}  &  -1x^{62}  & -1x^{61}  & -1x^{60}  \\
-1x^{59}  & +2x^{58}  &  +5x^{57}  & +3x^{56}  & -2x^{55}  & -10x^{54} &  -3x^{53}  &  -2x^{52}  & +6x^{51}  & +6x^{50}  \\
+1x^{49}  & +9x^{48}  & -3x^{47}  & -7x^{46}  & -8x^{45}  &  -8x^{44} & +10x^{43}  &  +6x^{42}  & +8x^{41}  & -5x^{40}  \\
-12x^{39}  & +7x^{38}  & -7x^{37}  & +7x^{36}  & +1x^{35}  &  -3x^{34} & +10x^{33}  &  +1x^{32}  & -6x^{31}  & -2x^{30}  \\
-10x^{29}  & -3x^{28}  & +2x^{27}  & +9x^{26}  & -3x^{25}  & +14x^{24} &  -8x^{23}  &            & -7x^{21}  & +9x^{20}  \\
+3x^{19}  & -4x^{18}  & -10x^{17}  & -7x^{16}  & +12x^{15}  &  +7x^{14} & +2x^{13}  & -12x^{12}  & -4x^{11}  & -2x^{10}  \\
+5x^{9}   &           & +1x^{7}   &  -7x^{6}  &  +7x^{5}   &  -4x^{4}  & +12x^{3}   &  -6x^{2}   &  +3x^{1}  & -6x^{0}  \\
\end{matrix}$$

This polynomial was correctly given in Conway's original Eureka article, but in the reprinted version in the book edited by Cover and Gopinath the term $x^{35}$ was incorrectly printed with a minus sign in front.

== Popularization ==
The look-and-say sequence is also popularly known as the Morris Number Sequence, after cryptographer Robert Morris, and the puzzle "What is the next number in the sequence 1, 11, 21, 1211, 111221?" is sometimes referred to as the Cuckoo's Egg, from a description of Morris in Clifford Stoll's book The Cuckoo's Egg.

== Variations ==
There are many possible variations on the rule used to generate the look-and-say sequence. For example, to form the "pea pattern" one reads the previous term and counts all instances of each digit, listed in order of their first appearance, not just those occurring in a consecutive block. So beginning with the seed 1, the pea pattern proceeds 1, 11 ("one 1"), 21 ("two 1s"), 1211 ("one 2 and one 1"), 3112 ("three 1s and one 2"), 132112 ("one 3, two 1s and one 2"), 311322 ("three 1s, one 3 and two 2s"), etc. This version of the pea pattern eventually forms a cycle with the two "atomic" terms 23322114 and 32232114. Since the sequence is infinite, the length of each element in the sequence is bounded, and there are only finitely many words that are at most a predetermined length, it must eventually repeat, and as a consequence, pea pattern sequences are always eventually periodic.

Other versions of the pea pattern are also possible; for example, instead of reading the digits as they first appear, one could read them in ascending order instead (sequence A005151 in the OEIS). In this case, the term following 21 would be 1112 ("one 1, one 2") and the term following 3112 would be 211213 ("two 1s, one 2 and one 3"). This variation ultimately ends up repeating the number 21322314 ("two 1s, three 2s, two 3s and one 4").

These sequences differ in several notable ways from the look-and-say sequence. Notably, unlike the Conway sequences, a given term of the pea pattern does not uniquely define the preceding term. Moreover, for any seed the pea pattern produces terms of bounded length: This bound will not typically exceed 2 × Radix + 2 digits (22 digits for decimal: radix = 10) and may only exceed 3 × Radix digits (30 digits for decimal radix) in length for long, degenerate, initial seeds (sequence of "100 ones", etc.). For these extreme cases, individual elements of decimal sequences immediately settle into a permutation of the form a0 b1 c2 d3 e4 f5 g6 h7 i8 j9 where here the letters a–j are placeholders for digit counts from the preceding sequence element.

== See also ==
- Gijswijt's sequence
- Kolakoski sequence
- Autogram
