= Recreational mathematics =

Form of entertainment in mathematics

John Conway's game of life breeder-pattern animation.

Recreational mathematics is mathematics carried out for recreation (entertainment) rather than as a strictly research-and-application-based professional activity or as a part of a student's formal education.

The Mathematical Association of America (MAA) has seventeen Special Interest Groups which includes a recreational math group called SIGMAA-Rec. The SIGMAA-Rec website defines recreational mathematics as, "...a broad term that covers many different areas including games, puzzles, magic, art, and more."

Although it is not necessarily limited to being an endeavor for amateurs, many topics in this field require no knowledge of advanced mathematics. Mathematical competitions (such as those sponsored by mathematical associations) are also categorized under recreational mathematics.

== Areas of mathematics ==
An example of a mathematical puzzle that challenges players to deduce the start of a linear sequence that has changed into a continuous circle. The terms of the sequence have been expressed Algebraically.

The Knight's tour, a mathematical chess problem, animated.

Some of the more well-known topics in recreational mathematics are Rubik's Cubes, magic squares, fractals, logic puzzles and mathematical chess problems, but this area of mathematics includes the aesthetics and culture of mathematics, peculiar or amusing stories and coincidences about mathematics, and the personal lives of mathematicians.

== History ==
=== 1200s ===
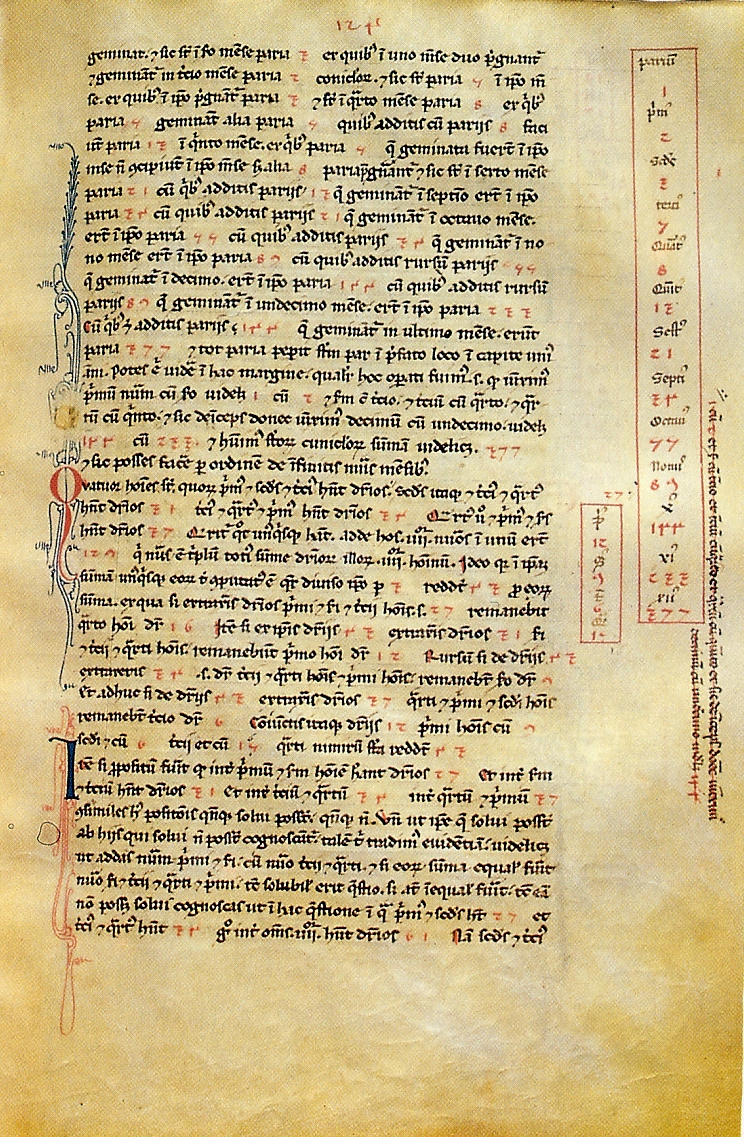
A page of Fibonacci's Liber Abaci from the Biblioteca Nazionale di Firenze showing (in box on right) 13 entries of the Fibonacci sequence.

The Liber Abaci or Liber Abbaci was written by Leonardo of Pisa, posthumously known as Fibonacci. Multiple math puzzles are presented with one titled, How Many Pairs of Rabbits Are Created by One Pair in One Year.

=== 1700s ===
Choi Seok-jeong (Korean: 최석정; Hanja: 崔錫鼎; 1646–1715) made the earliest known form of latin squares in his book Gusuryak (Koo-Soo-Ryak: Korean: 구수략; Hanja: 九數略). The mathematical-puzzle game Sudoku created in the 1970s is a special case of Latin squares.

=== 1800s ===
The Lady's and Gentleman's Diary was a recreational math magazine created by Wesley S. B. Woolhouse which ran from 1704 to 1871.

=== 1900s ===
The first Sudoku puzzle is developed by Howard Garns and published by Dell Magazines in May 1979, and the puzzles spread to Japan in April 1984.

== Forms ==
Numeracy is a requirement for recreational activities, from knowing the range of people who can participate at a time to using specific areas of knowledge to participate at all. Hobbyists enjoy finding the mathematical sides of the world and creating enjoyable experiences with mathematics.

=== Books ===
Different from a singular math word problem mathematical fiction books may involve multiple problems which further build upon each other as the story progresses.

One example is a children's-book series called Usborne Puzzle Adventures.

Throughout the book, there are puzzles which you must solve for the next part of the story to make sense. Clues and evidence lurk in the words and the pictures...If you get stuck, there are extra clues to help you...They are printed in a secret way, so you will have to work out how to read them first.

— Karen Dolby, Usborne Puzzle Adventures: Danger at Demon's Cove, About this Book

=== Games ===
Young people playing a Mancala-variant called Igisoro, a traditional Rwandan game.

Mathematical games are multiplayer games whose rules, strategies, and outcomes can be studied and explained using mathematics. The players of the game may not need to use explicit mathematics in order to play mathematical games. For example, Mancala is studied in the mathematical field of combinatorial game theory, but no mathematics is necessary in order to play it.

=== Mathemagics ===
Mathematical explanation of the Twenty-One Card Trick: The cards are dealt into three piles which are accumulated with the pile containing the target card (shaded yellow and labelled with the step number) put in the middle. This is done three times, the middle card (*) is the one in all chosen piles.

Magic tricks based on mathematical principles can produce self-working but surprising effects. For instance, a mathemagician might use the combinatorial properties of a deck of playing cards to guess a volunteer's selected card, or Hamming codes to identify whether a volunteer is lying.

=== Music ===
Mathematics is used to create and understand music.

There are subgenres of music which are directly inspired by mathematics, such as math rock.

Math and music examples
Audio	About	Genre
	Fractal Study -1 "...Fractal Study no. 1 is a soft ambient piece created by a nonlinear function." - User:Rozencrantz~commonswiki	ambient

=== Puzzles ===
Clumsy wagon, a puzzle that has as its core a mathematical problem that seeks to verify if it is possible for a wagon with only two points of contact to pass through a winding rail, available on the collection of Matemateca IME-USP.

Mathematical puzzles require mathematics in order to solve them. They have specific rules, as do multiplayer games, but mathematical puzzles do not usually involve competition between two or more players. Instead, in order to solve such a puzzle, the solver must find a solution that satisfies the given conditions.

Logic puzzles and classical ciphers are common examples of mathematical puzzles. Cellular automata and fractals are also considered mathematical puzzles, even though the solver only interacts with them by providing a set of initial conditions.

As they often include or require game-like features or thinking, mathematical puzzles are sometimes also called mathematical games. These games can be done through different forms of media, such as board games, books, comics, and video games.

=== Other activities ===
Origami-inspired engineering to discover how to make self-folding structures.

Other curiosities and pastimes of non-trivial mathematical interest include:

- patterns in juggling
- the sometimes profound algorithmic and geometrical characteristics of origami
- patterns and process in creating string figures such as Cat's cradles, etc.
- fractal-generating software
- Mathematics and art

== Relationship with the sciences ==
A video from the Wikibook, 'Physics Explained Through a Video Game.'

The academic field of mathematics is a core-component for others, such as chemistry and physics. Whenever there is recreational play in those academic fields they include recreational mathematics as well.

== Distributors ==
Recreational mathematics is shared in similar ways as other hobbies. Individual enthusiasts and math-related organizations will make and share what they have created and/or learned.

=== People ===
Prominent practitioners and advocates of recreational mathematics have included professional and amateur mathematicians:

Full name	Last name	Born	Died	Nationality	Description
Alcuin of York	Alcuin	735	804	English	Clergyman, scholar, and teacher; author of Propositiones ad Acuendos Juvenes.
Lewis Carroll (Charles Dodgson)	Carroll	1832	1898	English	Mathematician, puzzlist and Anglican deacon best known as the author of Alice in Wonderland and Through the Looking-Glass.
Sam Loyd	Loyd	1841	1911	American	Chess problem composer and author, described as "America's greatest puzzlist" by Martin Gardner.
W.W. Rouse Ball	Ball	1850	1925	British	Author of Mathematical Recreations and Essays, continuously published since 1892.
Henry Dudeney	Dudeney	1857	1930	English	Civil servant described as England's "greatest puzzlist".
Yakov Perelman	Perelman	1882	1942	Russian	Author of many popular science and mathematics books, including Mathematics Can Be Fun.
J.A.H. Hunter	Hunter	1902	1986	British	Author of Fun with Figures.
D. R. Kaprekar	Kaprekar	1905	1986	Indian	Discovered several results in number theory, described several classes of natural numbers including the Kaprekar, harshad and self numbers, and discovered the Kaprekar's constant
Martin Gardner	Gardner	1914	2010	American	Popular mathematics and science writer; author of Mathematical Games, a long-running Scientific American column.
Raymond Smullyan	Smullyan	1919	2017	American	Logician; author of many logic puzzle books including "To Mock a Mockingbird".
Joseph Madachy	Madachy	1927	2014	American	Long-time editor of Journal of Recreational Mathematics, author of Mathematics on Vacation.
Solomon W. Golomb	Golomb	1932	2016	American	Mathematician and engineer, best known as the inventor of polyominoes.
Noboyuki Yoshigahara	Yoshigahara	1936	2004	Japanese	Japan's most celebrated inventor, collector, solver, and communicator of puzzles.
Vladimir Arnold	Arnold	1937	2010	Russian	Prolific mathematician and educator; author of Problems for children from 5 to 15.
John Horton Conway	Conway	1937	2020	English	Mathematician and inventor of Conway's Game of Life, co-author of Winning Ways, an analysis of many mathematical games.
Lee Sallows	Sallows	1944		English	Invented geomagic squares, golygons, and self-enumerating sentences.
Ian Stewart	Stewart	1945		British	Mathematician and author; his work includes the Mathematical Recreations column for Scientific American and numerous books on recreational mathematics.
Peter Winkler	Winkler	1946		American	Mathematician and author of several books on recreational mathematics.

=== Online blogs, podcasts, and YouTube channels ===
There are many blogs and audio or video series devoted to recreational mathematics. Among the notable are the following:

- The Breaking Math Podcast - Episode 001

- Cut-the-Knot by Alexander Bogomolny
- Futility Closet by Greg Ross
- Mathologer by Burkard Polster
- Numberphile by Brady Haran
- Stand-Up Maths by Matt Parker
- MindYourDecisions by Presh Talwalkar
- The videos of Vi Hart

=== Publications ===
- The journal Eureka published by the mathematical society of the University of Cambridge is one of the oldest publications in recreational mathematics. It has been published 60 times since 1939 and authors have included many famous mathematicians and scientists such as Martin Gardner, John Conway, Roger Penrose, Ian Stewart, Timothy Gowers, Stephen Hawking and Paul Dirac.
- The Journal of Recreational Mathematics was the largest publication on this topic from its founding in 1968 until 2014 when it ceased publication.
- Mathematical Games (1956 to 1981) was the title of a long-running Scientific American column on recreational mathematics by Martin Gardner. He inspired several generations of mathematicians and scientists through his interest in mathematical recreations. "Mathematical Games" was succeeded by 25 "Metamagical Themas" columns (1981–1983), a similarly distinguished, but shorter-running, column by Douglas Hofstadter, then by 78 "Mathematical Recreations" and "Computer Recreations" columns (1984 to 1991) by A. K. Dewdney, then by 96 "Mathematical Recreations" columns (1991 to 2001) by Ian Stewart, and most recently "Puzzling Adventures" by Dennis Shasha.
- The Recreational Mathematics Magazine, published by the Ludus Association, is electronic and semiannual, and focuses on results that provide amusing, witty but nonetheless original and scientifically profound mathematical nuggets. The issues are published in the exact moments of the equinox.

== See also ==
- List of recreational number theory topics
- Mathematics of paper folding (origami)
