= Kolakoski sequence =

Infinite sequence in mathematics

Visualisation of the 3rd to 50th terms of the Kolakoski sequence as a spiral. The terms start at the dot at the middle of the spiral. In the following revolution, each arc is repeated if the term is 1, or divided into two equal halves if it is 2. The first two terms cannot be shown as they are self-referential. In the SVG image, hover over an arc or label to highlight it and show its statistics.

In mathematics, the Kolakoski sequence, sometimes also known as the Oldenburger–Kolakoski sequence, is an infinite sequence of symbols {1,2} that is the sequence of run lengths in its own run-length encoding. It is named after the recreational mathematician William Kolakoski (1944–97) who described it in 1965, but it was previously discussed by Rufus Oldenburger in 1939.

== Definition ==
the Kolakoski sequence describes its own run length

The initial terms of the Kolakoski sequence are:

1,2,2,1,1,2,1,2,2,1,2,2,1,1,2,1,1,2,2,1,2,1,1,2,1,2,2,1,1,... (sequence A000002 in the OEIS)

Each symbol occurs in a "run" (a sequence of equal elements) of either one or two consecutive terms, and writing down the lengths of these runs gives exactly the same sequence:

1,2,2,1,1,2,1,2,2,1,2,2,1,1,2,1,1,2,2,1,2,1,1,2,1,2,2,1,1,2,1,1,2,1,2,2,1,2,2,1,1,2,1,2,2,...

1, 2 , 2 ,1,1, 2 ,1, 2 , 2 ,1, 2 , 2 ,1,1, 2 ,1,1, 2 , 2 ,1, 2 ,1,1, 2 ,1, 2 , 2 ,1,1, 2 ,...

The description of the Kolakoski sequence is therefore reversible. If K stands for "the Kolakoski sequence", description #1 logically implies description #2 (and vice versa):

1. The terms of K are generated by the runs (i.e., run-lengths) of K
2. The runs of K are generated by the terms of K

Accordingly, one can say that each term of the Kolakoski sequence generates a run of one or two future terms. The first 1 of the sequence generates a run of "1", i.e. itself; the first 2 generates a run of "22", which includes itself; the second 2 generates a run of "11"; and so on. Each number in the sequence is the length of the next run to be generated, and the element to be generated alternates between 1 and 2:

1,2 (length of sequence l = 2; sum of terms s = 3)
1,2,2 (l = 3, s = 5)
1,2,2,1,1 (l = 5, s = 7)
1,2,2,1,1,2,1 (l = 7, s = 10)
1,2,2,1,1,2,1,2,2,1 (l = 10, s = 15)
1,2,2,1,1,2,1,2,2,1,2,2,1,1,2 (l = 15, s = 23)

As can be seen, the length of the sequence at each stage is equal to the sum of terms in the previous stage. This animation illustrates the process:

An animated gif illustrating how later terms of the Kolakoski sequence are generated by earlier terms.

These self-generating properties, which remain if the sequence is written without the initial 1, mean that the Kolakoski sequence can be described as a fractal, or mathematical object that encodes its own representation on other scales. Bertran Steinsky has created a recursive formula for the i-th term of the sequence.

== Research ==
=== Recurrence properties ===
The sequence is not eventually periodic, that is, its terms do not have a general repeating pattern (cf. irrational numbers like π and √2). More generally, the sequence is cube-free, i.e., has no substring of the form $www$ with $w$ some nonempty finite string. It is not known whether every string appearing in the sequence occurs infinitely many times, nor whether the occurrence of a string implies the occurrence of its reverse string; the two facts, however, are known to be equivalent.

=== Density ===
It seems plausible that the density of 1s in the Kolakoski {1,2}-sequence is 1/2, but this conjecture remains unproved. Václav Chvátal has proved that the upper density of 1s is less than 0.50084. Nilsson has used the same method with far greater computational power to obtain the bound 0.500080.

Although calculations of the first 3×10^{8} values of the sequence appeared to show its density converging to a value slightly different from 1/2, later calculations that extended the sequence to its first 10^{13} values show the deviation from a density of 1/2 growing smaller, as one would expect if the limiting density actually is 1/2.

=== Connection with tag systems ===
The Kolakoski sequence can also be described as the result of a simple cyclic tag system. However, as this system is a 2-tag system rather than a 1-tag system (that is, it replaces pairs of symbols by other sequences of symbols, rather than operating on a single symbol at a time) it lies in the region of parameters for which tag systems are Turing complete, making it difficult to use this representation to reason about the sequence.

== Algorithms ==
The Kolakoski sequence may be generated by an algorithm that, in the i-th iteration, reads the value x_{i} that has already been output as the i-th value of the sequence (or, if no such value has been output yet, sets x_{i} = i). Then, if i is odd, it outputs x_{i} copies of the number 1, while if i is even, it outputs x_{i} copies of the number 2. Thus, the first few steps of the algorithm are:

1. The first value has not yet been output, so set x_{1} = 1, and output 1 copy of the number 1
2. The second value has not yet been output, so set x_{2} = 2, and output 2 copies of the number 2
3. The third value x_{3} was output as 2 in the second step, so output 2 copies of the number 1.
4. The fourth value x_{4} was output as 1 in the third step, so output 1 copy of the number 2. Etc.

This algorithm takes linear time, but because it needs to refer back to earlier positions in the sequence it needs to store the whole sequence, taking linear space. An alternative algorithm that generates multiple copies of the sequence at different speeds, with each copy of the sequence using the output of the previous copy to determine what to do at each step, can be used to generate the sequence in linear time and only logarithmic space.

== See also ==
- Golomb sequence — another self-generating sequence based on run-length
- Gijswijt's sequence
- Look-and-say sequence
