= Joseph Madachy =

American mathematician

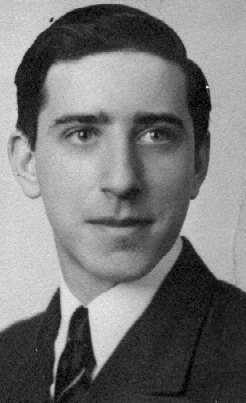
- Born: March 16, 1927; Star Junction, Pennsylvania, USA
- Died: March 27, 2014 (aged 87); Dayton, Ohio, USA
- Known for: Journal of Recreational Mathematics
- Scientific career
- Fields: recreational mathematics

Joseph Steven Madachy (March 16, 1927 – March 27, 2014) was a research chemist, technical editor and recreational mathematician. He was the lead editor of Journal of Recreational Mathematics for nearly 30 years and then served as editor emeritus. He was owner, publisher and editor of its predecessor, Recreational Mathematics Magazine, which appeared from 1961 to 1964.

== Early life and education ==
Madachy was born in Star Junction, Pennsylvania, to Steven and Anne Madachy. He was raised in Cleveland, Ohio. He became interested in recreational mathematics after reading Eugene Northrop's 1944 book, Riddles in Mathematics. After service in World War II, he attended Western Reserve University on the G.I. Bill and earned a bachelor's and a master's in Chemistry.

== Career ==
Madachy moved to Dayton, Ohio, and worked for Mound Laboratories. He made original contributions to the field of recreational mathematics. In 1960 he wrote to recreational mathematician Martin Gardner, asking whether Gardner knew of any publications devoted solely to recreational mathematics, as he was considering starting such a project. Gardner responded in the negative, including a box containing his correspondence and suggesting Madachy could use the addresses to promote the magazine. From February 1961 to 1964 Madachy published the bimonthly Recreational Mathematics Magazine.

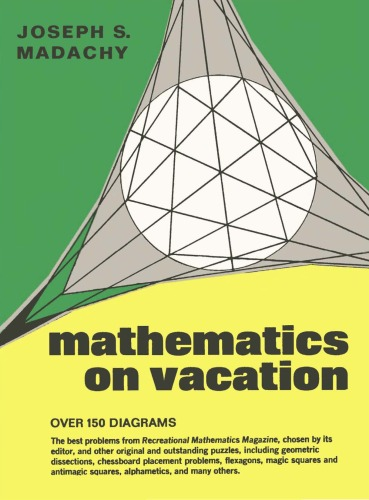
Mathematics on Vacation

In 1967, Greenwood Press asked him to start the journal again under the title Journal of Recreational Mathematics, which was published by Baywood Publishing starting in 1973. He authored several books on recreational mathematics, including Mathematics on Vacation (1966), Madachy's Mathematical Recreations and Mathematical Diversions. He served as the literary agent for Dmitri Borgmann's Language on Vacation. Longtime colleagues and co-authors include Martin Gardner, Harry L. Nelson, and Isaac Asimov, and Solomon Golomb (with pentominos).

He worked with polyominoes, pentominos, prime numbers, and amicable numbers. He worked developing mathematical concepts such as cryptarithmetic, used in cyber security applications. He made contributions to Fibonacci series and narcissistic numbers and devised puzzles using Fibonacci numbers. His recreational mathematics work included areas in chess, magic squares and calculator art.

Madachy retired from editing Journal of Recreational Mathematics in 2000.

Pentomino Puzzle Solutions

== In popular culture ==
Madachy is mentioned in the Jack Reacher novel series in the book Never Go Back, which uses perfect digit-to-digit invariant numbers in the plot: "Such numbers had been much discussed by a guy called Joseph Madachy, who once upon a time had been the owner, publisher, and editor of a magazine called Journal of Recreational Mathematics."

== Personal life ==
Madachy and his wife, Juliana, lived in Dayton, Ohio and had six children.
