= Geometric magic square =

Form of magic squares using shapes

Figure 1: A geomagic square with same-sized pieces (decominoes)

A geometric magic square, often abbreviated to geomagic square, is a generalization of magic squares invented by Lee Sallows in 2001. A traditional magic square is a square array of numbers (almost always positive integers) whose sum taken in any row, any column, or in either diagonal is the same target number. A geomagic square, on the other hand, is a square array of geometrical shapes in which those appearing in each row, column, or diagonal can be fitted together to create an identical shape called the target shape.

As with numerical types, it is required that the entries in a geomagic square be distinct. Similarly, the eight trivial variants of any square resulting from its rotation and/or reflection are all counted as the same square. By the dimension of a geomagic square is meant the dimension of the pieces it uses. Hitherto interest has focused mainly on 2D squares using planar pieces, but pieces of any dimension are permitted.

== Examples ==
Figure 1 above shows a 3 × 3 geomagic square. The 3 pieces occupying each row, column and diagonal pave a rectangular target, as seen at left and right, and above and below. Here the 9 pieces are all decominoes, but pieces of any shape may appear, and it is not a requirement that they be of same size. In Figure 2, for instance, the pieces are polyominoes of consecutive sizes from 1 up to 9 units. The target is a 4 × 4 square with an inner square hole.

Surprisingly, computer investigations show that Figure 2 is just one among 4,370 distinct 3 × 3 geomagic squares using pieces with these same sizes and same target. Conversely, Figure 1 is one of only two solutions using similar-sized pieces and identical target. In general, repeated piece sizes imply fewer solutions. However, at present there exists no theoretical underpinning to explain these empirical findings.

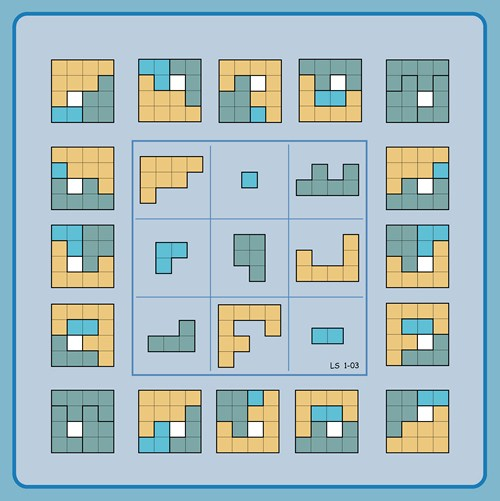
Figure 2: A geomagic square using consecutively-sized pieces.

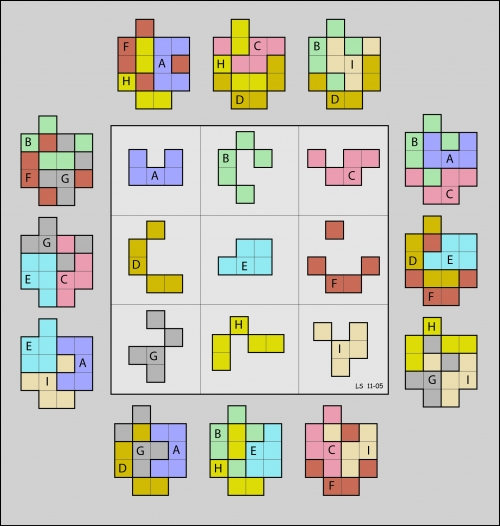
Figure 3: A panmagic 3 × 3 geomagic square

The pieces in a geomagic square may also be disjoint, or composed of separated islands, as seen in Figure 3. Since they can be placed so as to mutually overlap, disjoint pieces are often able to tile areas that connected pieces cannot. The rewards of this extra pliancy are often to be seen in geomagics that possess symmetries denied to numerical specimens.

Besides squares using planar shapes, there exist 3D specimens, the cells of which contain solid pieces that will combine to form the same constant solid target. Figure 5 shows an example in which the target is a cube.

== History ==
A well-known formula due to the mathematician Édouard Lucas characterizes the structure of every 3 × 3 magic square of numbers. Sallows, already the author of original work in this area, had long speculated that the Lucas formula might contain hidden potential. This surmise was confirmed in 1997 when he published a short paper that examined squares using complex numbers, a ploy leading to a new theorem that correlated every 3 × 3 magic square with a unique parallelogram on the complex plane. Continuing in the same vein, a decisive next step was to interpret the variables in the Lucas formula as standing for geometrical forms, an outlandish idea that led directly to the concept of a geomagic square. It turned out to be an unexpected consequence of this find that traditional magic squares now became revealed as one-dimensional geomagic squares.

Other researchers also took notice. Charles Ashbacher, co-editor of the Journal of Recreational Mathematics, speaks of the field of magic squares being "dramatically expanded" Peter Cameron, winner of the London Mathematical Society's Whitehead Prize and joint winner of the Euler Medal, called geomagic squares "a wonderful new piece of recreational maths, which will delight non-mathematicians and give mathematicians food for thought." Mathematics writer Alex Bellos said, "To come up with this after thousands of years of study of magic squares is pretty amazing." It may be asked whether geomagic squares might have applications outside the study of puzzles. Cameron is convinced of it, saying, "I can immediately see a lot of things I'd like to do with this."

== Methods of construction ==
Trivial examples excepted, there are no known easy methods for producing geomagic squares. To date, two approaches have been explored. Where the pieces to be used are polyforms, or shapes built up from repeated units, an exhaustive search by computer becomes possible.

In the case of Figure 1, for instance, a first step would be to decide on the piece sizes to be used (in this case all the same), and the shape of the desired target. An initial program would then be able to generate a list L corresponding to every possible tiling of this target shape by 3 distinct decominoes (polyominoes of size 10). Each decomino is represented by a unique integer, so that L will consist of a list of integer triads. A subsequent routine can then run through and test every combination of three different triads in turn. The test will consist in treating the candidate triads as the row entries in a 3 × 3 square, and then checking to see whether the columns and diagonals thus formed each contain 3 integers that are also in L—which is to say, are also target-tiling triads. If so, a 3 × 3 geomagic square using 9 decominoes and selected target has been identified. If this fails, alternative target shapes can be tried. An elaborated version of the same method can be used to search for larger squares, or for squares including differently-sized pieces.

An alternative method of construction begins with a trivial geomagic square showing repeated pieces, the shapes of which are then modified so as to render each distinct, but without disrupting the square's magic property. This is achieved by means of an algebraic template such as seen below, the distinct variables in which are then interpreted as different shapes to be either appended to or excised from the initial pieces, depending on their sign.

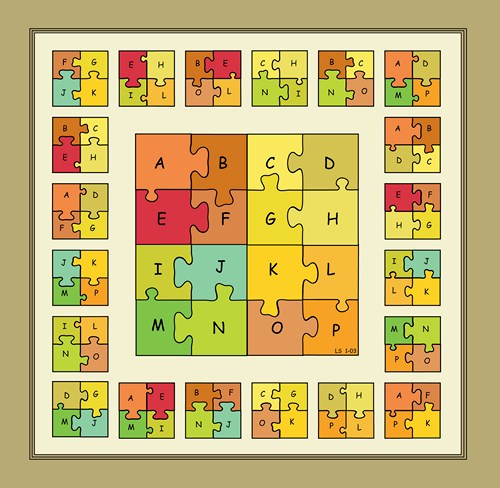
Figure 4: A 'self-interlocking' geomagic square

Figure 4 illustrates such a geometrical interpretation of the template in which k is interpreted as a small square shape, while a, b, c and d represent the protrusions (+) and/or indentations (-) by means of which it becomes modified so as to result in 16 distinct jigsaw pieces.

$$\begin{array}{|c|c|c|c|}
\hline
k+a+b & k-a+d & k-c-d & k-b+c \\
\hline
k+a-b & k-a-d & k-c+d & k+b+c \\
\hline
k-a-b & k+a-d & k+c+d & k+b-c \\
\hline
k-a+b & k+a+d & k+c-d & k-b-c \\
\hline
\end{array}$$

== Relation to traditional magic squares ==
Contrary to the impression made at first sight, it is a misunderstanding to regard the term 'geomagic square' as referring to some category of magic square. In fact the exact opposite is the case: every (additive) magic square is a particular instance of a geomagic square, but never vice versa. The point is made clear by the example below that appears in a wide-ranging article on geomagic squares by Jean-Paul Delahaye in Pour la Science, the French version of Scientific American. In this case the target "shape" for the geomagic square at right is simply a one dimensional line segment 15 units long, the pieces again being no more than straight line segments. As such, the latter is a straightforward translation into geometrical terms of the numerical magic square at left.

Target is 15
4	9	2
3	5	7
8	1	6

Target is •••••••••••••••
••••	•••••••••	••
•••	•••••	•••••••
••••••••	•	••••••

As Delahaye says, "This example shows that the geomagic square concept generalizes magic squares. The result here is hardly spectacular, but happily there are other geomagic squares that are not the result of such a translation."

The point being that every numerical magic square can be understood as a one-dimensional geomagic square as above. Or as Sallows himself puts it, "Traditional magic squares featuring numbers are then revealed as that particular case of 'geomagic' squares in which the elements are all one-dimensional." This however does not exhaust the 1D case, because there exist 1D geomagic squares whose components are disconnected line segments, and which do not correspond to any numerical magic square. Thus, even in dimension one, the traditional types correspond to only a tiny subset of all geometric magic squares.

== Special types ==
The richer structure of geomagic squares is reflected in the existence of specimens showing a far greater degree of 'magic' than is possible with numerical types. Thus a panmagic square is one in which every diagonal, including the so-called broken diagonals, shares the same magic property as the rows and columns. However, it is easily shown that a panmagic square of size 3 × 3 is impossible to construct with numbers, whereas a geometric example can be seen in Figure 3. No comparable example using connected pieces has yet been reported.

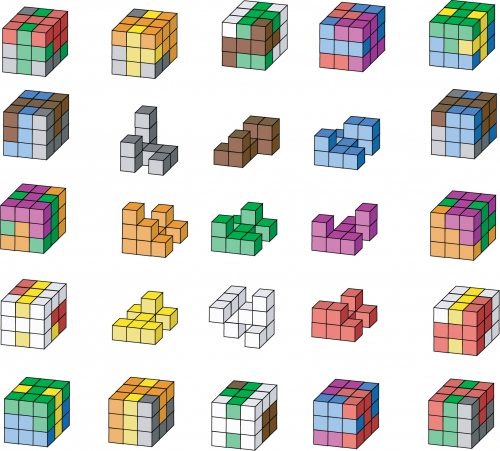
Figure 5: A 3D geomagic square with cubic target shapes

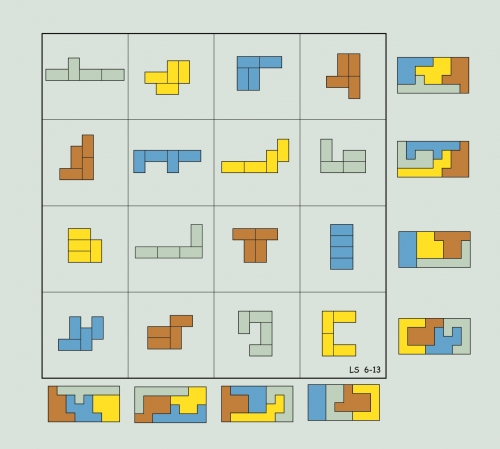
Figure 6: A geomagic square whose pieces comprise a self-tiling tile set

In addition to being geomagic, there exist squares with auxiliary properties making them even more distinctive. In Figure 6, for example, which is magic on rows and columns only, the 16 pieces form a so-called self-tiling tile set. Such a set is defined as any set of n distinct shapes, each of which can be tiled by smaller replicas of the complete set of n shapes.

A second example is Figure 4, which is a so-called 'self-interlocking' geomagic square. Here the 16 pieces are no longer contained within separate cells, but define the square cell shapes themselves, so as to mesh together to complete a square-shaped jigsaw.

== Geomagic squares in popular culture ==
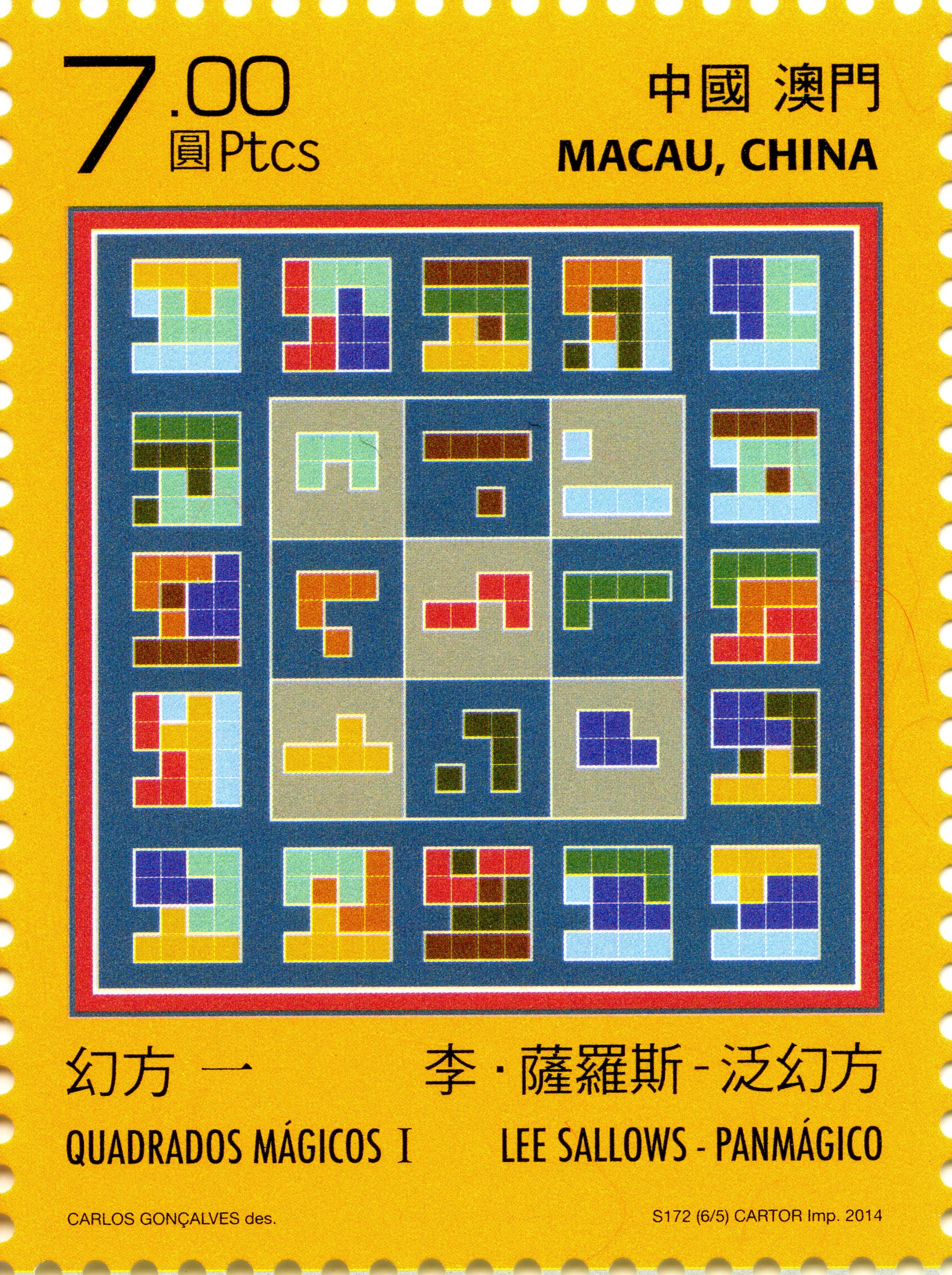
Macau stamp featuring a geometric magic square

On October 9, 2014 the post office of Macau issued a series of stamps based on magic squares. The stamp below, showing one of the geomagic squares created by Sallows, was chosen to be in this collection.
