= Alphamagic square =

Magic square with extra constraints

An alphamagic square is a magic square that remains magic when its numbers are replaced by the number of letters occurring in the name of each number. Hence 3 would be replaced by 5, the number of letters in "three". Since different languages will have a different number of letters for the spelling of the same number, alphamagic squares are language-dependent. The term alphamagic was coined by Lee Sallows in 1986.

== Example ==
The example below is alphamagic. To find out if a magic square is also an alphamagic square, convert it into the array of corresponding number words. For example,

5	22	18
28	15	2
12	8	25

converts to ...

five	twenty-two	eighteen
twenty-eight	fifteen	two
twelve	eight	twenty-five

Counting the letters in each number word generates the following square which turns out to also be magic:

4	9	8
11	7	3
6	5	10

If the generated array is also a magic square, the original square is alphamagic. In 2017, British computer scientist Chris Patuzzo discovered several doubly alphamagic squares in which the generated square is in turn an alphamagic square.

The above example enjoys another special property: the nine numbers in the lower square are consecutive. This prompted Martin Gardner to describe it as "Surely the most fantastic magic square ever discovered."

== A geometric alphamagic square ==
Figure 1: A geomagic square that is also alphamagic

Sallows has produced a still more magical version—a square which is both geomagic and alphamagic. In the square shown in Figure 1, any three shapes in a straight line—including the diagonals—tile the cross; thus the square is geomagic. The number of letters in the number names printed on any three shapes in a straight line sum to forty five; thus the square is alphamagic.

== Other languages ==
The Universal Book of Mathematics provides the following information about Alphamagic Squares:

A surprisingly large number of 3 × 3 alphamagic squares exist—in English and in other languages. French allows just one 3 × 3 alphamagic square involving numbers up to 200, but a further 255 squares if the size of the entries is increased to 300. For entries less than 100, none occurs in Danish or in Latin, but there are 6 in Dutch, 13 in Finnish, and an incredible 221 in German. Yet to be determined is whether a 3 × 3 square exists from which a magic square can be derived that, in turn, yields a third magic square—a magic triplet. Also unknown is the number of 4 × 4 and 5 × 5 language-dependent alphamagic squares.

In 2018, the first 3 × 3 Russian alphamagic square was found by Jamal Senjaya. Following that, another 158 3 × 3 Russian alphamagic squares were found (by the same person) where the entries do not exceed 300.
