= Burkard Polster =

German mathematician

- Born: 26 February 1965 (age 61); Würzburg, Germany
- Education: University of Erlangen–Nuremberg
- Scientific career
- Fields: Mathematics
- Workplaces: Monash University
- Thesis: Stetige planare Funktionen [Continuous planar functions] (1993)
- Doctoral advisor: Karl Strambach

YouTube information
- Channel: Mathologer
- Years active: 2015–present
- Subscribers: 968 thousand
- Views: 76.1 million
- Last updated: 20 October 2026
- Website: www.qedcat.com

Burkard Polster (born 26 February 1965 in Würzburg) is a German mathematician who runs and presents the Mathologer channel on YouTube. He is a professor of mathematics at Monash University in Melbourne, Australia.

== Education and career ==
Polster earned a doctorate from the University of Erlangen–Nuremberg in 1993 under the supervision of Karl Strambach. Other universities that Polster has been affiliated with, before joining Monash University in 2000, include the University of Würzburg, University at Albany, University of Kiel, University of California, Berkeley, University of Canterbury, and University of Adelaide.

Polster's research involves topics in geometry, recreational mathematics, and the mathematics of everyday life, including how to tie shoelaces or stabilize a wobbly table.

== Books ==
Polster is the author of multiple books including:

- A Geometrical Picture Book. Springer. 1998. ISBN 0-387-98437-2.
- Geometries on Surfaces. with Günter Steinke. Cambridge University Press. 2001. ISBN 0-521-66058-0.
- The Mathematics of Juggling. Springer. 2003. ISBN 0-387-95513-5.
- Q.E.D.: Beauty in Mathematical Proof. Wooden Books. 2004. ISBN 190426350X. Included in the four-book compilation Scientia: Mathematics, Physics, Chemistry, Biology, and Astronomy for All (2011) and translated into German as Sciencia: Mathematik, Physik, Chemie, Biologie und Astronomie für alle verständlich (Librero, 2014, in German).
- Les Ambigrammes: l'art de symétriser les mots (in French). Editions Ecritextes. 2004. ISBN 2915633002.
- The Shoelace Book: A Mathematical Guide to the Best (and Worst) Ways to Lace Your Shoes. American Mathematical Society. 2006. ISBN 0821839330.
- Eye Twisters: Ambigrams & Other Visual Puzzles to Amaze and Entertain. Constable. 2007. ISBN 9781402757983.
- Math Goes to the Movies. with Marty Ross. Johns Hopkins University Press. 2012. ISBN 9781421404837.
- A Dingo Ate My Math Book: Mathematics from Down Under. with Marty Ross. American Mathematical Society. 2017. ISBN 9781470435219.
- Putting Two and Two Together. with Marty Ross. American Mathematical Society. 2022. ISBN 978-1-4704-6011-2.
