= Lee Sallows =

British electronics engineer (born 1944)

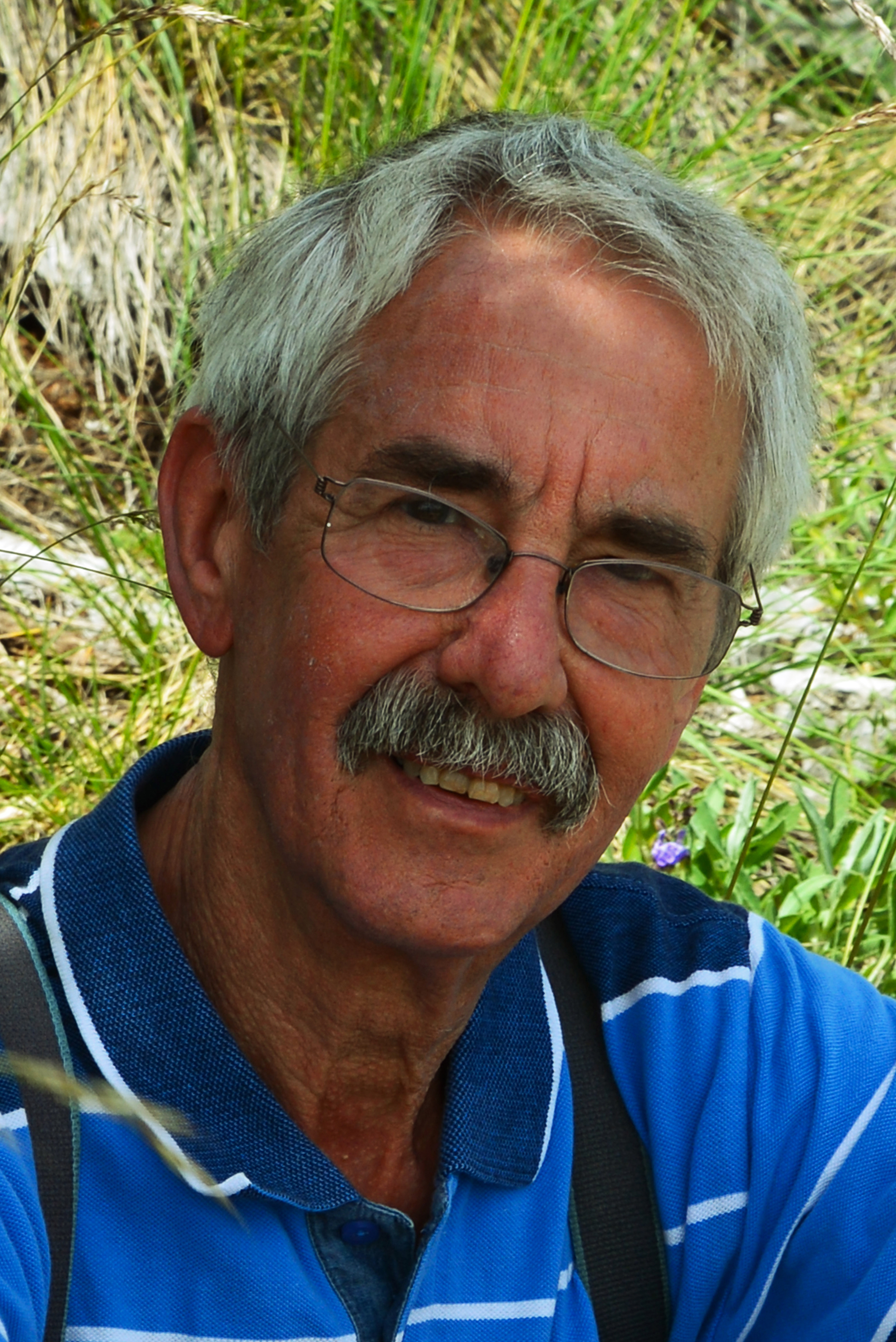
- Born: April 30, 1944 (age 82); Welwyn, Hertfordshire
- Known for: Golygons; Alphamagic squares Geometric magic squares Self-tiling tile sets Self-enumerating sentences
- Scientific career
- Fields: Recreational mathematics

Lee Cecil Fletcher Sallows (born April 30, 1944) is a British electronics engineer known for his contributions to recreational mathematics. He is particularly noted as the inventor of golygons, self-enumerating sentences, and geomagic squares.

== Recreational mathematics ==
Sallows is an expert on the theory of magic squares and has invented several variations on them, including alphamagic squares and geomagic squares. The latter invention caught the attention of mathematician Peter Cameron, who has said that he believes that "an even deeper structure may lie hidden beyond geomagic squares".

In "The lost theorem" published in 1997 he showed that every 3 × 3 magic square is associated with a unique parallelogram on the complex plane, a discovery that had escaped all previous researchers from ancient times down to the present day.

A golygon is a polygon containing only right angles, such that adjacent sides exhibit consecutive integer lengths. Golygons were invented and named by Sallows and introduced by A.K. Dewdney in the Computer Recreations column of the July 1990 issue of Scientific American.

In 2012 Sallows invented and named self-tiling tile sets—a new generalization of rep-tiles.

== Triangle theorem ==
Visual proof of Lee Sallows's triangle theorem

In 2014, Sallows discovered a previously unnoticed result, a way of using the medians to divide any triangle into three smaller triangles, all congruent with one another. Repeating the process on each triangle yields triangles similar to the original but a ninth the area.

== Personal life ==
Lee Sallows is the only son of Florence Eliza Fletcher and Leonard Gandy Sallows. He was born on 30 April 1944 at Brocket Hall in Hertfordshire, England, and grew up in the district of Upper Clapton in northeast London. Sallows attended Dame Alice Owen's School, then located at The Angel, Islington, but failed to settle in and was without diplomas when he left at age 17. Knowledge gained via interest in short-wave radio enabled him to find work as a technician within the electronics industry. In 1970, he moved to Nijmegen in the Netherlands, where, until 2009, he worked as an electronic engineer at Radboud University. In 1975, Sallows met his partner Evert Lamfers, a Dutch cardiologist, with whom he has lived ever since.

== Bibliography ==
- 2014 Sallows, Lee "More On Self-tiling Tile Sets", Mathematics Magazine, April 2014
- 2012 Sallows, Lee. "On Self-Tiling Tile Sets", Mathematics Magazine, December, 2012
- 2012 "Geometric Magic Squares: A Challenging New Twist Using Colored Shapes Instead of Numbers", Dover Publications, ISBN 0486489094
- 1997 "The Lost Theorem", The Mathematical Intelligencer 1997 19; 4: 51–54.
- 1995 "The Impossible Problem", The Mathematical Intelligencer 1995 17; 1: 27–33.
- 1994 "Alphamagic Squares", In: The Lighter Side of Mathematics pp 305–39, Edited by R.K. Guy and R.E. Woodrow, pub. by The Mathematical Association of America, 1994, ISBN 0-88385-516-X
- 1992 Sallows, Lee (1992). "New pathways in serial isogons". The Mathematical Intelligencer. 14 (2): 55–67. doi:10.1007/BF03025216. S2CID 121493484.
- 1991 Sallows, Lee; Gardner, Martin; Guy, Richard K.; Knuth, Donald (1991). "Serial isogons of 90 degrees". Mathematics Magazine. 64 (5): 315–324. doi:10.2307/2690648. JSTOR 2690648.
- 1990 "A Curious New Result in Switching Theory", The Mathematical Intelligencer 1990; 12: 21–32.
- 1987 "In Quest of a Pangram", In: A Computer Science Reader, pp 200–20, Edited by EA Weiss, Springer-Verlag, New York, ISBN 978-1-4612-6458-3
- 1986 "Co-Descriptive Strings", (Lee Sallows & Victor L Eijkhout), Mathematical Gazette 1986; 70: 1–10
