= Journal of Recreational Mathematics =

- Discipline: Recreational mathematics
- Language: English
- Edited by: Charles Ashbacher, Lamarr Widmer

Publication details
- History: 1968–2014
- Publisher: Baywood Publishing Company (United States)
- Frequency: Quarterly

Standard abbreviations
- ISO 4: J. Recreat. Math.

Indexing
- ISSN: 0022-412X

The Journal of Recreational Mathematics was an American journal dedicated to recreational mathematics, started in 1968. It had generally been published quarterly by the Baywood Publishing Company, until it ceased publication with the last issue (volume 38, number 2) published in 2014. The initial publisher (of volumes 1–5) was Greenwood Periodicals.

Harry L. Nelson was primary editor for five years (volumes 9 through 13, excepting volume 13, number 4, when the initial editor returned as lead) and Joseph Madachy, the initial lead editor and editor of a predecessor called Recreational Mathematics Magazine which ran during the years 1961 to 1964, was the editor for many years. Charles Ashbacher and Colin Singleton took over as editors when Madachy retired (volume 30 number 1). The final editors were Ashbacher and Lamarr Widmer. The journal has from its inception also listed associate editors, one of whom was Leo Moser.

The journal contains:

1. Original articles
2. Book reviews
3. Alphametics And Solutions To Alphametics
4. Problems And Conjectures
5. Solutions To Problems And Conjectures
6. Proposer's And Solver's List For Problems And Conjectures

== Indexing ==
The journal is indexed in:

- Academic Search Premier
- Book Review Index
- International Bibliography of Periodical Literature
- International Bibliography of Book Reviews
- Readers' Guide to Periodical Literature
- The Gale Group
