= Rufus Oldenburger =

American mathematician

Rufus Oldenburger (6 July 1908, Grand Rapids, Michigan – 22 November 1969) was an American mathematician and mechanical engineer.

== Education and career ==
Oldenburger received an A.B. degree from the University of Chicago in 1928, a master's degree in mathematics in 1930, and a Ph.D. in 1934. After teaching mathematics at the University of Michigan, at the Case Institute of Technology, at Illinois Institute of Technology, and at DePaul University, he changed the focus of his research from pure mathematics to mechanical engineering and automatic control. He was an invited speaker at the International Congress of Mathematicians in 1936 at Oslo. For the academic year 1937–38 he was a visiting scholar at the Institute for Advanced Study in Princeton.

Among his engineering achievements are many contributions in the fields of prime-mover speed governors, in particular electric governors for hydraulic turbines, diesel governors with optimum non-linear control, and a new type of hydraulic governor without dashpots. He also developed a computer-type gas turbine control, a signal stabilization device, and a rapid method of finding the roots of algebraic equations especially for the problem of control design. In 1956 he was named professor of engineering science and mechanical engineering at Purdue, later being appointed professor of electrical and mechanical engineering, and then professor of mechanical engineering in the School of Mechanical Engineering. He was also the founder and Director of the Automatic Control Center at Purdue. Author of two books and editor-co-author of five others, Oldenburger wrote some 110 papers. Forty of these were on pure mathematics devoted to higher dimensional determinants and matrices, higher degree polynomials and forms, and symbolic dynamics. He read and spoke eight modern languages and lectured abroad extensively.

His 1939 paper, "Exponent trajectories in symbolic dynamics", introduced the integer sequence now known as the Oldenburger–Kolakoski sequence.

In 1968, he was the first recipient of the Rufus Oldenburger Medal, an annually awarded medal named in his honor by the American Society of Mechanical Engineers.

== Selected publications ==
=== Articles ===
- Oldenburger, Rufus (1932). "On canonical binary trilinear forms". Bulletin of the American Mathematical Society. 38 (6): 385–387. doi:10.1090/s0002-9904-1932-05398-8. MR 1562403.
- Oldenburger, Rufus (1934). "Composition and rank of n-way matrices and multilinear forms". Annals of Mathematics. 35 (3): 622–653. doi:10.2307/1968754. JSTOR 1968754.
- Oldenburger, Rufus (1936). "Non-singular multi-linear forms and certain p-way matrix factorizations". Transactions of the American Mathematical Society. 39 (3): 422–455. doi:10.1090/s0002-9947-1936-1501856-7. MR 1501856.
- Oldenburger, Rufus (1936). "On arithmetic invariants of binary cubic and binary trilinear forms". Bulletin of the American Mathematical Society. 42 (12): 871–873. doi:10.1090/s0002-9904-1936-06453-0. MR 1563456.
- Oldenburger, Rufus (1937). "Real canonical binary symmetric trilinear forms". Bulletin of the American Mathematical Society. 43 (8): 546–553. doi:10.1090/s0002-9904-1937-06600-6. MR 1563584.
- Oldenburger, Rufus (1938). "Rational equivalence of a form to a sum of pth powers". Transactions of the American Mathematical Society. 44 (2): 219–249. doi:10.1090/s0002-9947-1938-1501968-x. MR 1501968.
- Oldenburger, Rufus (1939). "Exponent trajectories in symbolic dynamics". Transactions of the American Mathematical Society. 46: 453–466. doi:10.1090/s0002-9947-1939-0000352-9. MR 0000352. (See also: Kolakoski sequence.)
- Oldenburger, Rufus (1939). "Decomposition of elements in abelian groups". Bulletin of the American Mathematical Society. 45 (2): 152–158. doi:10.1090/s0002-9904-1939-06926-7. MR 1563930.
- Oldenburger, Rufus (1940). "Complete reducibility of forms". Bulletin of the American Mathematical Society. 46 (2): 88–92. doi:10.1090/s0002-9904-1940-07141-1. MR 0001196.
- with Arthur Porges: Oldenburger, Rufus; Porges, Arthur (1940). "The minimal numbers of binary forms". Bulletin of the American Mathematical Society. 46 (8): 694–697. doi:10.1090/s0002-9904-1940-07282-9. MR 0002833.
- Oldenburger, Rufus (1940). "Higher dimensional determinants". American Mathematical Monthly. 47 (1): 25–33. doi:10.2307/2304053. JSTOR 2304053.
- Oldenburger, Rufus (1941). "Recurrence of symbolic elements in dynamics". Bulletin of the American Mathematical Society. 47 (4): 294–297. doi:10.1090/s0002-9904-1941-07443-4. MR 0004099.
- Oldenburger, Rufus (1943). "The characteristic of a quadratic form for an arbitrary field". Transactions of the American Mathematical Society. 53 (3): 454–462. doi:10.1090/s0002-9947-1943-0008588-9. MR 0008588.
- Oldenburger, Rufus (1943). "Expansions of quadratic forms". Bulletin of the American Mathematical Society. 49 (2): 136–141. doi:10.1090/s0002-9904-1943-07876-7. MR 0007738.
- with C. C. Liu: Oldenburger, R.; Liu, C. C. (1959). "Signal stabilization of a control system". Transactions of the American Institute of Electrical Engineers, Part II: Applications and Industry. 78 (2): 96–100. doi:10.1109/TAI.1959.6371545. S2CID 51667819.
- with Rangasami Sridhar: Sridhar, Rangasami; Oldenburger, Rufus (1962). "Stability of a nonlinear feedback system in the presence of Gaussian noise". Journal of Fluids Engineering. 84 (1): 61–69. doi:10.1115/1.3657270.
- with R. E. Goodson: Oldenburger, Rufus; Goodson, R. E. (1964). "Simplification of hydraulic line dynamics by use of infinite products". Journal of Fluids Engineering. 86 (1): 1–8. doi:10.1115/1.3653102.
- with Javeed S. Ansari: Ansari, J. S.; Oldenburger, R. (1967). "Propagation of disturbance in fluid lines". Journal of Fluids Engineering. 89 (2): 415–422. doi:10.1115/1.3609622.

=== Books ===
- Mathematical engineering analysis. Macmillan. 1950. Ames, Joseph Sweetman; Murnaghan, Francis D.; Bowman, Frank; Franklin, Philip; Kemble, Edwin C.; MacMillan, William Duncan; Wills, A. P.; Dill, E. H. (1961). "Dover reprint". Physics Today. 12 (9): 56. Bibcode:1959PhT....12i..56A. doi:10.1063/1.3060978.
- as editor: Frequency response. Macmillan. 1956.
- Optimal control. Holt, Rinehart and Winston. 1966.
- as editor: Optimal and self-optimizing control. M.I.T. Press. 1966.
- with R. C. Boyer: Self-oscillations in sampled-data systems with saturation. Industrial Engineering Bulletin, vol. 50, no. 5. Purdue University, Lafayette, Ind. 1966; 92 pages

== Patents ==
- "Non-linear speed and load governor for alternators." U.S. Patent No. 2,908,826. 13 Oct. 1959.
- "Method and apparatus for controlling a condition." U.S. Patent No. 2,960,629. 15 Nov. 1960.
- with Forrest Drake George: "Method and apparatus for hydraulic control systems." U.S. Patent No. 2,931,342. 5 Apr. 1960.
- with F. D. George: "Hydraulic differentiation." U.S. Patent No. 2,992,650. 18 Jul. 1961.
- "Hydraulic governors." U.S. Patent No. 3,051,138. 28 Aug. 1962.
- "Automatic control system." U.S. Patent No. 3,163,813. 29 Dec. 1964.
- "Hydraulic governor mechanism having plural error detecting means." U.S. Patent No. 3,238,956. 8 Mar. 1966.
