= Self-tiling tile set =

Set of shapes that can be tiled with smaller replicas of the same set

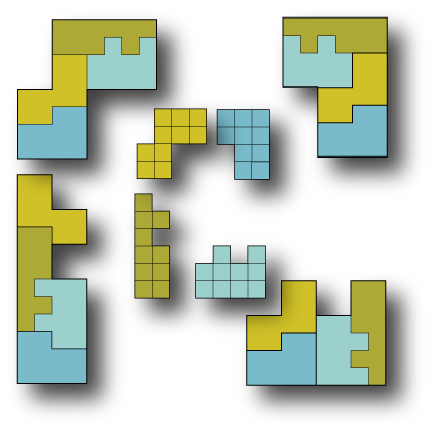
Figure 1: A 'perfect' self-tiling tile set of order 4

A self-tiling tile set, or setiset, of order n is a set of n shapes or pieces, usually planar, each of which can be tiled with smaller replicas of the complete set of n shapes. That is, the n shapes can be assembled in n different ways so as to create larger copies of themselves, where the increase in scale is the same in each case. Figure 1 shows an example for n = 4 using distinctly shaped decominoes. The concept can be extended to include pieces of higher dimension. The name setisets was coined by Lee Sallows in 2012, but the problem of finding such sets for n = 4 was asked decades previously by C. Dudley Langford, and examples for polyaboloes (discovered by Martin Gardner, Wade E. Philpott and others) and polyominoes (discovered by Maurice J. Povah) were previously published by Gardner.

== Examples and definitions ==
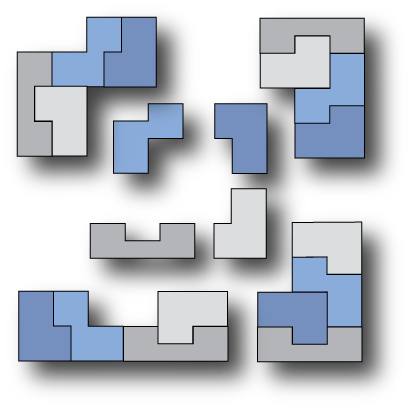
Figure 2: A setiset with duplicated piece.

From the above definition it follows that a setiset composed of n identical pieces is the same thing as a 'self-replicating tile' or rep-tile, of which setisets are therefore a generalization. Setisets using n distinct shapes, such as Figure 1, are called perfect. Figure 2 shows an example for n = 4 which is imperfect because two of the component shapes are the same.

The shapes employed in a setiset need not be connected regions. Disjoint pieces composed of two or more separated islands are also permitted. Such pieces are described as disconnected, or weakly-connected (when islands join only at a point), as seen in the setiset shown in Figure 3.

The fewest pieces in a setiset is two. Figure 4 encapsulates an infinite family of order 2 setisets each composed of two triangles, P and Q. As shown, the latter can be hinged together to produce a compound triangle that has the same shape as P or Q, depending upon whether the hinge is fully open or fully closed. This unusual specimen thus provides an example of a hinged dissection.

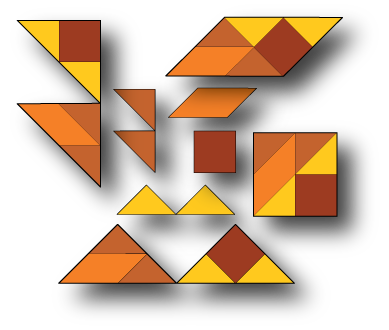
Figure 3: A setiset showing weakly-connected pieces.

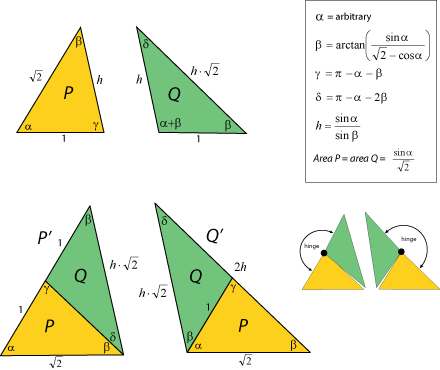
Figure 4: An infinite family of order 2 setisets.

== Inflation and deflation ==
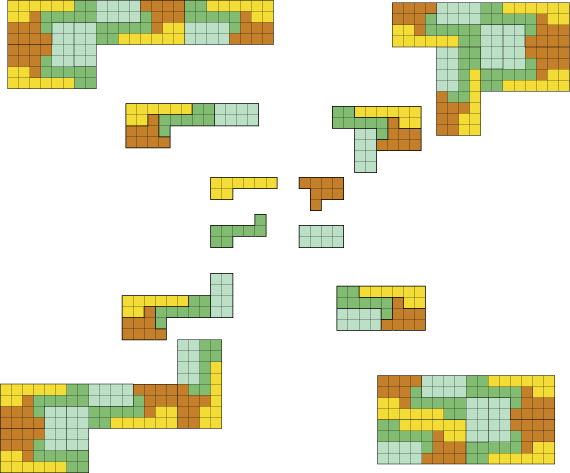
Figure 5: A setiset of order 4 using octominoes. Two stages of inflation are shown.

The properties of setisets mean that their pieces form substitution tilings, or tessellations in which the prototiles can be dissected or combined so as to yield smaller or larger duplicates of themselves. Clearly, the twin actions of forming still larger and larger copies (known as inflation), or still smaller and smaller dissections (deflation), can be repeated indefinitely. In this way, setisets can produce non-periodic tilings. However, none of the non-periodic tilings thus far discovered qualify as aperiodic, because the prototiles can always be rearranged so as to yield a periodic tiling. Figure 5 shows the first two stages of inflation of an order 4 set leading to a non-periodic tiling.

== Loops ==
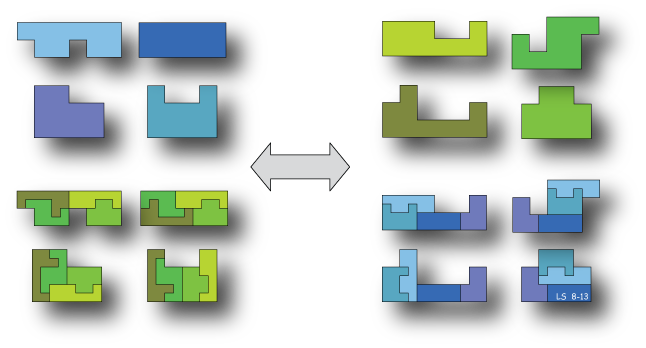
Figure 6: A loop of length 2 using decominoes.

Besides self-tiling tile sets, which can be interpreted as loops of length 1, there exist longer loops, or closed chains of sets, in which every set tiles its successor. Figure 6 shows a pair of mutually tiling sets of decominoes, in other words, a loop of length 2. Sallows and Schotel did an exhaustive search of order 4 sets that are composed of octominoes. In addition to seven ordinary setisets (i.e., loops of length 1) they found a bewildering variety of loops of every length up to a maximum of 14. The total number of loops identified was nearly one and a half million. More research in this area remains to be done, but it seems safe to suppose that other shapes may also entail loops.

== Methods of construction ==
To date, two methods have been used for producing setisets. In the case of sets composed of shapes such as polyominoes, which entail integral piece sizes, a brute force search by computer is possible, so long as n, the number of pieces involved, is not prohibitive. It is easily shown that n must then be a perfect square. Figures 1,2,3,5 and 6 are all examples found by this method.

Alternatively, there exists a method whereby multiple copies of a rep-tile can be dissected in certain ways so as to yield shapes that create setisets. Figures 7 and 8 show setisets produced by this means, in which each piece is the union of 2 and 3 rep-tiles, respectively. In Figure 8 can be seen how the 9 pieces above together tile the 3 rep-tile shapes below, while each of the 9 pieces is itself formed by the union of 3 such rep-tile shapes. Hence each shape can be tiled with smaller duplicates of the entire set of 9.

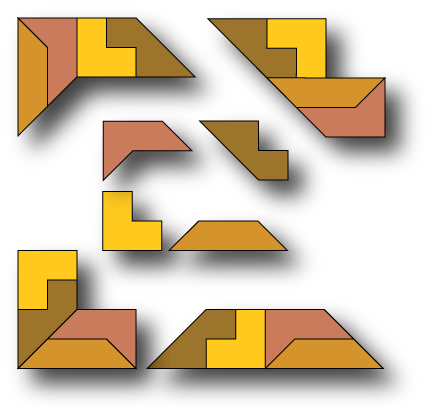
Figure 7: A rep-tile-based setiset of order 4.

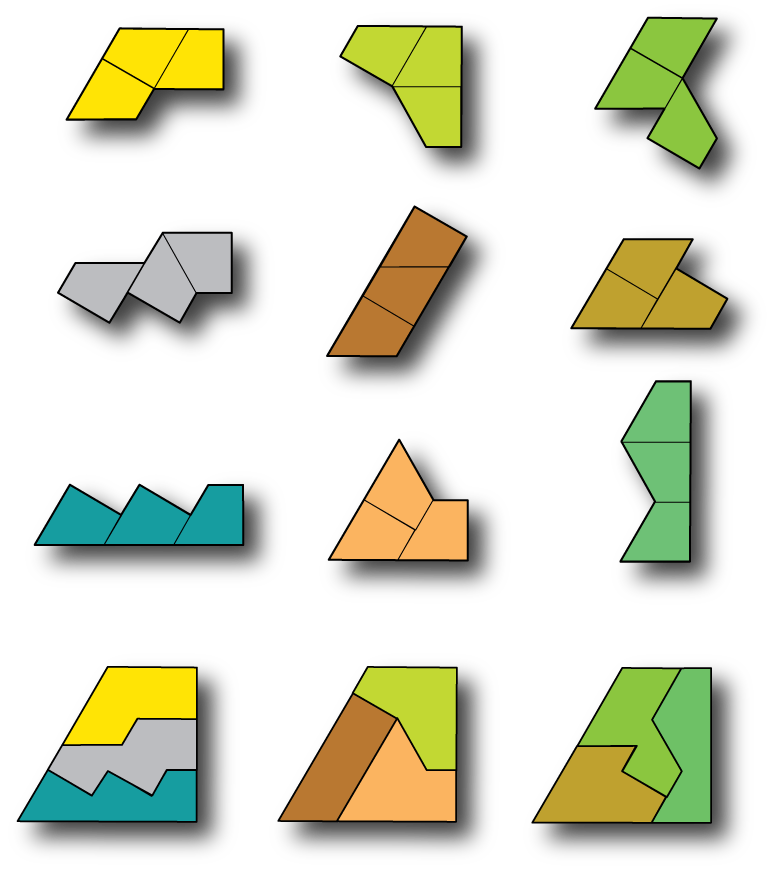
Figure 8: A rep-tile-based setiset of order 9.
