= Autogram =

Self-describing sentence

An autogram (Ancient Greek: αὐτός = self, γράμμα = letter) is an autological sentence that describes itself in the sense of providing an inventory of its own characters. They were invented by Lee Sallows, who also coined the word autogram. An essential feature is the use of full cardinal number names such as "one", "two", etc., in recording character counts. Autograms are also called 'self-enumerating' or 'self-documenting' sentences. Often, letter counts only are recorded while punctuation signs are ignored, as in this example:

This sentence employs two a's, two c's, two d's, twenty-eight e's, five f's, three g's, eight h's, eleven i's, three l's, two m's, thirteen n's, nine o's, two p's, five r's, twenty-five s's, twenty-three t's, six v's, ten w's, two x's, five y's, and one z.

The first autogram to be published was composed by Sallows in 1982 and appeared in Douglas Hofstadter's "Metamagical Themas" column in Scientific American.

Only the fool would take trouble to verify that his sentence was composed of ten a's, three b's, four c's, four d's, forty-six e's, sixteen f's, four g's, thirteen h's, fifteen i's, two k's, nine l's, four m's, twenty-five n's, twenty-four o's, five p's, sixteen r's, forty-one s's, thirty-seven t's, ten u's, eight v's, eight w's, four x's, eleven y's, twenty-seven commas, twenty-three apostrophes, seven hyphens and, last but not least, a single !

The task of constructing an autogram is perplexing because the object to be described cannot be known until its description is first complete.

== Self-enumerating pangrams ==
A type of autogram that has attracted special interest is the autogramic pangram, a self-enumerating sentence in which every letter of the alphabet occurs at least once. Certain letters do not appear in either of the two autograms above, which are therefore not pangrams. The first ever self-enumerating pangram appeared in a Dutch newspaper and was composed by Rudy Kousbroek. Sallows, who lives in the Netherlands, was challenged by Kousbroek to produce a self-enumerating 'translation' of this pangram into English—an impossible-seeming task. This prompted Sallows to construct an electronic Pangram Machine. Eventually the machine succeeded, producing the example below which was published in Scientific American in October 1984:

This pangram contains four as, one b, two cs, one d, thirty es, six fs, five gs, seven hs, eleven is, one j, one k, two ls, two ms, eighteen ns, fifteen os, two ps, one q, five rs, twenty-seven ss, eighteen ts, two us, seven vs, eight ws, two xs, three ys, & one z.

Sallows wondered if one could produce a pangram that counts its letters as percentages of the whole sentence–a particularly difficult task since such percentages usually won't be exact integers. He mentioned the problem to Chris Patuzzo and in late 2015 Patuzzo produced the following solution:

This sentence is dedicated to Lee Sallows and to within one decimal place four point five percent of the letters in this sentence are a's, zero point one percent are b's, four point three percent are c's, zero point nine percent are d's, twenty point one percent are e's, one point five percent are f's, zero point four percent are g's, one point five percent are h's, six point eight percent are i's, zero point one percent are j's, zero point one percent are k's, one point one percent are l's, zero point three percent are m's, twelve point one percent are n's, eight point one percent are o's, seven point three percent are p's, zero point one percent are q's, nine point nine percent are r's, five point six percent are s's, nine point nine percent are t's, zero point seven percent are u's, one point four percent are v's, zero point seven percent are w's, zero point five percent are x's, zero point three percent are y's and one point six percent are z's.

Later in 2017, Matthias Belz decided to push the boundaries further by making a pangrammatic autogram with a precision of five decimal places:

Rounded to five decimal places, two point six five two five two percent of the letters of this sentence are a’s, zero point zero eight eight four two percent are b’s, two point six five two five two percent are c’s, zero point four four two zero nine percent are d’s, nineteen point eight zero five four eight percent are e’s, three point four four eight two eight percent are f’s, one point seven six eight three five percent are g’s, two point nine one seven seven seven percent are h’s, seven point eight six nine one four percent are i’s, zero point zero eight eight four two percent are j’s, zero point zero eight eight four two percent are k’s, zero point three five three six seven percent are l’s, zero point one seven six eight three percent are m’s, ten point two five six four one percent are n’s, eight point nine three zero one five percent are o’s, four point seven seven four five four percent are p’s, zero point zero eight eight four two percent are q’s, nine point five four nine zero seven percent are r’s, four point nine five one three seven percent are s’s, nine point six three seven four nine percent are t’s, two point zero three three six zero percent are u’s, two point seven four zero nine four percent are v’s, one point six seven nine nine three percent are w’s, zero point nine seven two five nine percent are x’s, zero point zero eight eight four two percent are y’s and one point nine four five one eight percent are z’s.

However, no matter the precision of the rounding, the percentage of the letters used are still not exact. Therefore, in that same year Matthias Belz went on to create an pangrammatic autogram that uses exact percentages instead of rounded values:

Exactly three point eight seven five percent of the letters of this autogram are a’s, zero point one two five percent are b’s, three point five percent are c’s, zero point two five percent are d’s, twenty-one point two five percent are e’s, three point seven five percent are f’s, zero point three seven five percent are g’s, one point five percent are h’s, seven point two five percent are i’s, zero point one two five percent are j’s, zero point one two five percent are k’s, zero point three seven five percent are l’s, zero point two five percent are m’s, nine point seven five percent are n’s, seven point five percent are o’s, six point five percent are p’s, zero point one two five percent are q’s, nine point three seven five percent are r’s, five point one two five percent are s’s, ten percent are t’s, zero point three seven five percent are u’s, four point six two five percent are v’s, one point five percent are w’s, zero point five percent are x’s, zero point three seven five percent are y’s and one point five percent are z’s.

A shorter exact percentage autogram can be formed if the pangrammatic property is elided:

This self-enumerating sentence is composed of exactly zero point eight percent a’s, five point two percent c’s, zero point six percent d’s, seventeen percent e’s, one point eight percent f’s, one point two percent g’s, one point two percent h’s, seven point two percent i’s, one percent l’s, zero point six percent m’s, twelve point six percent n’s, nine point two percent o’s, eight point six percent p’s, six point six percent r’s, seven point six percent s’s, eleven point four percent t’s, one point four percent u’s, one point four percent v’s, one point four percent w’s, one point eight percent x’s, zero point four percent y’s and one percent z’s.

== Generalizations ==
Autograms exist that exhibit extra self-descriptive features. Besides counting each letter, here the total number of letters appearing is also named:

This sentence contains one hundred and ninety-seven letters: four a's, one b, three c's, five d's, thirty-four e's, seven f's, one g, six h's, twelve i's, three l's, twenty-six n's, ten o's, ten r's, twenty-nine s's, nineteen t's, six u's, seven v's, four w's, four x's, five y's, and one z.

Just as an autogram is a sentence that describes itself, so there exist closed chains of sentences each of which describes its predecessor in the chain. Viewed thus, an autogram is such a chain of length 1. Here follows a chain of length 2:

The right-hand sentence contains four a's, one b, three c's, three d's, thirty-nine e's, ten f's, one g, eight h's, eight i's, one j, one k, four l's, one m, twenty-three n's, fifteen o's, one p, one q, nine r's, twenty-three s's, twenty-one t's, four u's, seven v's, six w's, two x's, five y's, and one z.	The left-hand sentence contains four a's, one b, three c's, three d's, thirty-five e's, seven f's, four g's, eleven h's, eleven i's, one j, one k, one l, one m, twenty-six n's, fifteen o's, one p, one q, ten r's, twenty-three s's, twenty-two t's, four u's, three v's, five w's, two x's, five y's, and one z.

== Reflexicons ==
A special kind of autogram is the 'reflexicon' (short for "reflexive lexicon"), which is a self-descriptive word list that describes its own letter frequencies. The constraints on reflexicons are much tighter than on autograms because the freedom to choose alternative words such as "contains", "comprises", "employs", and so on, is lost. However, a degree of freedom still exists through appending entries to the list that are strictly superfluous.

For example, "Sixteen e's, six f's, one g, three h's, nine i's, nine n's, five o's, five r's, sixteen s's, five t's, three u's, four v's, one w, four x's" is a reflexicon, but it includes what Sallows calls "dummy text", which is only having one of some letter. Dummy text are in the form "one #", where "#" can be any typographical sign not already listed. Sallows has made an extensive computer search and conjectures that there exist only three pure (i.e., no dummy text) English reflexicons.

thirteen e's, five f's, two g's, five h's, eight i's, two l's, three n's, six o's, six r's, twenty s's, twelve t's, three u's, four v's, six w's, four x's, two y's.

fifteen e's, seven f's, four g's, six h's, eight i's, four n's, five o's, six r's, eighteen s's, eight t's, four u's, three v's, two w's, three x's.

sixteen e's, five f's, three g's, six h's, nine i's, five n's, four o's, six r's, eighteen s's, eight t's, three u's, three v's, two w's, four x's.

== Other variants ==
There are many different variants to autograms. One such variant is by representing the letter frequencies using Roman numerals:

This sentence has iii a's, i b, ii c's, ii d's, iv e's, i f, i g, iii h's, xxxiv i's, i j, i k, i l, i m, iv n's, i o, i p, i q, i r, xv s's, iii t's, i u, vii v's, i w, v x's, and i y.

The frequency count can also be replaced with the decimal form rather than its corresponding English numeral form:

This sentence has 3 a's, 1 b, 2 c's, 2 d's, 4 e's, 1 f, 1 g, 3 h's, 2 i's, 1 j, 1 k, 1 l, 1 m, 4 n's, 1 o, 1 p, 1 q, 1 r, 20 s's, 3 t's, 1 u, 1 v, 1 w, 1 x, 1 y, 3 0's, 20 1's, 8 2's, 6 3's, 3 4's, 1 5, 2 6's, 1 7, 2 8's, and 1 9.

== See also ==
- Quine (computing)
- Diagonal lemma
