= Puzzle =

Problem or enigma that tests a person's ingenuity

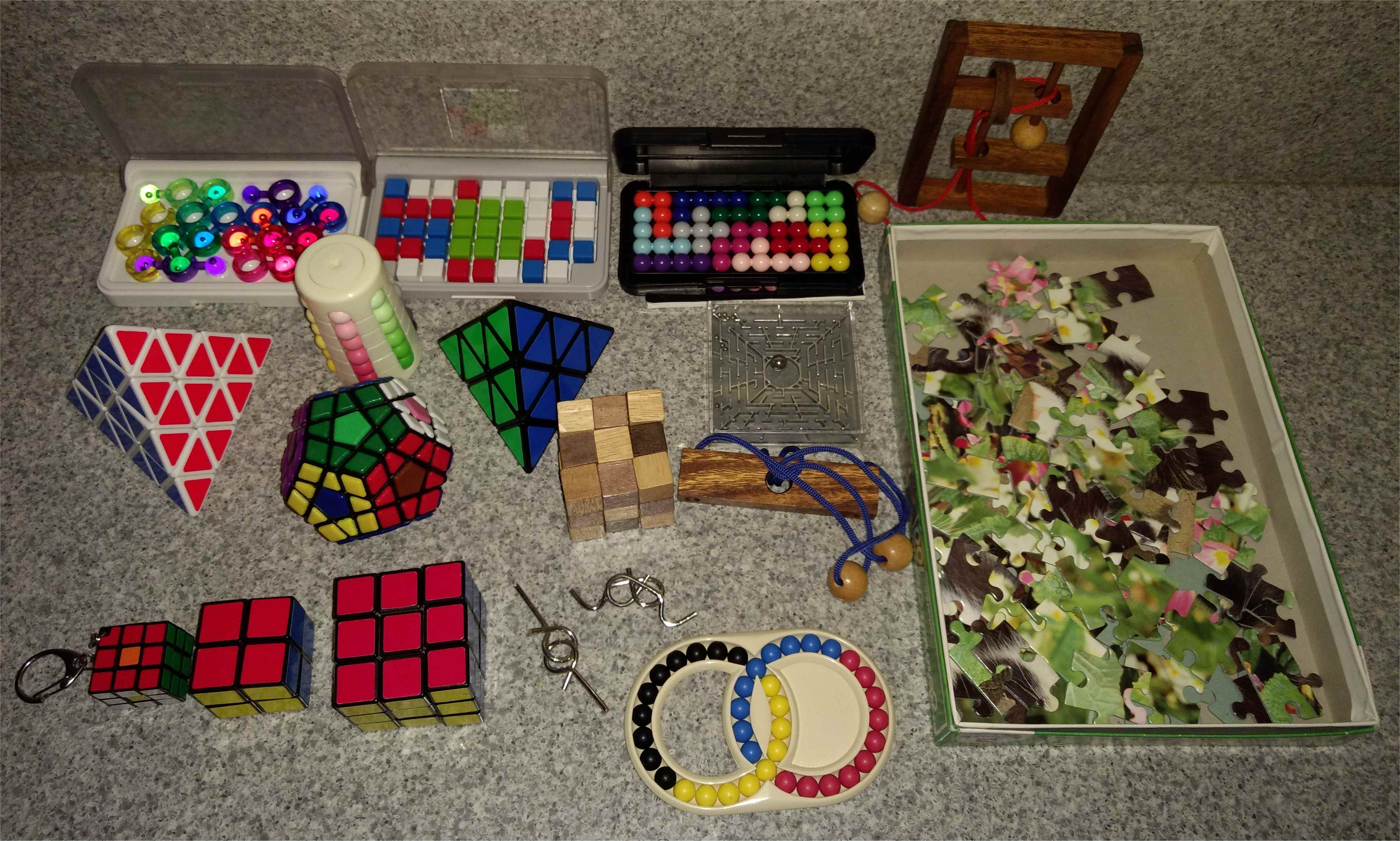
Various physical puzzles

A puzzle is a game, problem, or toy that tests a person's ingenuity or knowledge. In a puzzle, the solver is expected to put pieces together (or take them apart) in a logical way, in order to find the solution of the puzzle. There are different genres of puzzles, such as crossword puzzles, word-search puzzles, number puzzles, relational puzzles, and logic puzzles. The academic study of puzzles is called enigmatology.

Puzzles are often created to be a form of entertainment, but they can also arise from serious mathematical or logical problems. In such cases, their solution may be a significant contribution to mathematical research.

== Etymology ==
The Oxford English Dictionary dates the word puzzle (as a verb) to the 16th century. Its earliest use documented in the OED was in a book titled The Voyage of Robert Dudley...to the West Indies, 1594–95, narrated by Capt. Wyatt, by himself, and by Abram Kendall, master (published circa 1595). The word later came to be used as a noun, first as an abstract noun meaning 'the state or condition of being puzzled', and later developing the meaning of 'a perplexing problem'. The OED's earliest clear citation in the sense of 'a toy that tests the player's ingenuity' is from Sir Walter Scott's 1814 novel Waverley, referring to a toy known as a "reel in a bottle".

The etymology of the verb puzzle is described by OED as "unknown"; unproven hypotheses regarding its origin include an Old English verb puslian meaning 'pick out', and a derivation of the verb pose.

== Categories ==
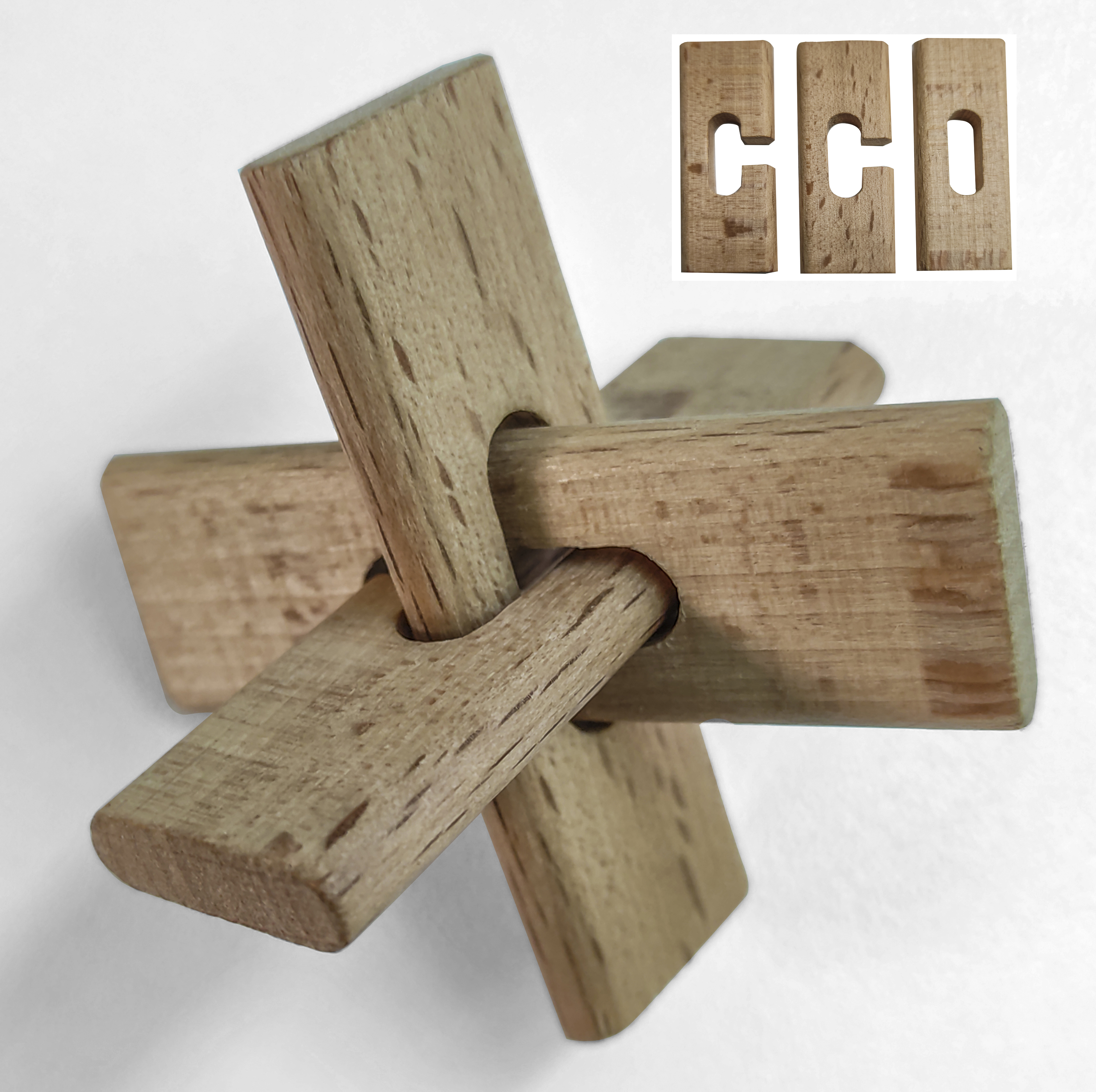
Simple wooden puzzle made of three pieces

Puzzles can be categorized as:

- Lateral thinking puzzles, also called "situation puzzles"
- Mathematical puzzles include the missing square puzzle and many impossible puzzles — puzzles which have no solution, such as the Seven Bridges of Königsberg, the three cups problem, and three utilities problem
  - Sangaku (Japanese temple tablets with geometry puzzles)
- A chess problem is a puzzle that uses chess pieces on a chess board. Examples are the knight's tour and the eight queens puzzle.
- Mechanical puzzles or dexterity puzzles such as the Rubik's Cube and Soma cube can be stimulating toys for children or recreational activities for adults.
  - combination puzzles like Peg solitaire
  - construction puzzles such as stick puzzles
  - disentanglement puzzles,
  - folding puzzles
  - jigsaw puzzles. Puzz 3D is a three-dimensional variant of this type.
  - lock puzzles
  - A puzzle box can be used to hide something — jewelry, for instance.
  - sliding puzzles (also called sliding tile puzzles) such as the 15 Puzzle and Sokoban
  - tiling puzzles like Tangram
- Metapuzzles are puzzles which unite elements of other puzzles.
- Paper-and-pencil puzzles such as Uncle Art's Funland, connect the dots, and nonograms
  - Also the logic puzzles published by Nikoli: Sudoku, Slitherlink, Kakuro, Fillomino, Hashiwokakero, Heyawake, Hitori, Light Up, Masyu, Number Link, Nurikabe, Ripple Effect, Shikaku, and Kuromasu; takuzu.
- Spot the difference
- Tour puzzles like a maze
- Word puzzles, including anagrams, ciphers, crossword puzzles, Hangman (game), dropquotes, and word search puzzles. Tabletop and digital word puzzles include Bananagrams, Boggle, Bonza, Dabble, Letterpress, Perquackey, Puzzlage, Quiddler, Ruzzle, Scrabble, Upwords, WordSpot, and Words with Friends. Wheel of Fortune is a game show centered on a word puzzle.
- Puzzle video games
  - Tile-matching video game
  - Puzzle-platformer
  - Adventure game
  - Hidden object game
  - Minesweeper

== Puzzle solving ==
Solutions of puzzles often require the recognition of patterns and the adherence to a particular kind of order. People with a high level of inductive reasoning aptitude may be better at solving such puzzles compared to others. But puzzles based upon inquiry and discovery may be solved more easily by those with good deduction skills. Deductive reasoning improves with practice. Mathematical puzzles often involve BODMAS. BODMAS is an acronym which stands for Bracket, Of, Division, Multiplication, Addition and Subtraction. In certain regions, PEMDAS (Parentheses, Exponents, Multiplication, Division, Addition and Subtraction) is the synonym of BODMAS. It explains the order of operations to solve an expression. Some mathematical puzzles require top to bottom convention to avoid the ambiguity in the order of operations. It is an elegantly simple idea that relies, as sudoku does, on the requirement that numbers appear only once starting from top to bottom as coming along.

== Puzzle makers ==
Puzzle makers are people who make puzzles. In general terms of occupation, a puzzler or puzzlist is someone who composes and/or solves puzzles.

Some notable creators of puzzles are:

- Ernő Rubik
- Sam Loyd
- Henry Dudeney
- Boris Kordemsky
- Will Shortz
- Oskar van Deventer
- Lloyd King
- Martin Gardner
- Raymond Smullyan

== History of puzzles ==
Jigsaw puzzles were invented around 1760, when John Spilsbury, a British engraver and cartographer, mounted a map on a sheet of wood, which he then sawed around the outline of each individual country on the map. He then used the resulting pieces as an aid for the teaching of geography.

After becoming popular among the public, this kind of teaching aid remained the primary use of jigsaw puzzles until about 1820.

The largest puzzle (40,320 pieces) is made by a German game company Ravensburger. The smallest puzzle ever made was created at LaserZentrum Hannover. It is only five square millimeters, the size of a sand grain.

The puzzles that were first documented are riddles. In Europe, Greek mythology produced riddles like the riddle of the Sphinx. Many riddles were produced during the Middle Ages, as well.

By the early 20th century, magazines and newspapers found that they could increase their readership by publishing puzzle contests, beginning with crosswords and in modern days sudoku.

== Organizations and events ==
There are organizations and events that cater to puzzle enthusiasts, such as:

- Nob Yoshigahara Puzzle Design Competition
- World Puzzle Championship
- National Puzzlers' League
- National Puzzle Day
- Puzzlehunts such as the Maze of Games
- World Cube Association

== See also ==
- List of impossible puzzles
- List of Nikoli puzzle types – Japanese puzzle publisher and magazine
- Riddle – Statement with a double meaning used as a puzzle
