= Puzzle Series =

Video game series

Puzzle Series is a series of puzzle video games by Hudson Soft.

== Titles ==
Games in the main Puzzle Series brand are collected as numbered volumes according to platform.

=== DS Puzzle Series ===
Games in the DS Puzzle Series are:

- Vol. 1: JIGSAWPUZZLE, released March 23, 2006 in Japan
- Vol. 2: CROSSWORD, released March 23, 2006 in Japan
- Vol. 3: SUDOKU, released March 23, 2006 in Japan, later released as Sudoku Gridmaster in North America and Sudoku Master in Europe
- Vol. 4: KAKURO, released August 10, 2006 in Japan
- Vol. 5: SLITHERLINK, released November 16, 2006 in Japan (an unofficial translation patch providing English menus is now available)
- Vol. 6: ILLUST LOGIC, released November 16, 2006 in Japan
- Vol. 7: CROSSWORD 2, released November 16, 2006 in Japan
- Vol. 8: NANKURO (ナンクロ, Nankuro; short for "Number Crossword"), released December 14, 2006 in Japan
- Vol. 9: SUDOKU 2 Deluxe, released December 21, 2006 in Japan
- Vol. 10: HITORI, released March 8, 2007 in Japan
- Vol. 11: NURIKABE, released March 8, 2007 in Japan
- Vol. 12: AKARI, released March 8, 2007 in Japan
- Vol. 13: KANJI PUZZLE, released March 29, 2007 in Japan

On October 5, 2007, Hudson began to phase out the Puzzle Series brand, announcing a new puzzle series for the Nintendo DS. The titles are:

- Illustlogic DS + Colorful Logic (イラストロジックDS+からふるロジック), released October 25 in Japan.
- Crossword DS + Sekai 1-Shuu Cross (クロスワードDS＋世界1周クロス), released on October 25 in Japan.
- Jigsawpuzzle DS: DS de Meguru Sekai Isan no Tabi (ジグソーパズルＤＳ - ＤＳで巡る世界遺産の旅), released March 6, 2008 in Japan
- Sudoku DS: Nikoli no Sudoku Ketteiban (数独ＤＳ ニコリのSUDOKU 決定版), released May 29, 2008 in Japan,

==== DSiWare games ====
In 2009, Hudson began releasing DSiWare adaptations of some of its puzzle games:

- Sudoku 50! (Sudoku Student in America), adapted from Sudoku DS: Nikoli no Sudoku Ketteiban, released March 18, 2009 in Japan, June 26, 2009 in Europe
- Sudoku 150! (Sudoku Master in America), adapted from Sudoku DS: Nikoli no Sudoku Ketteiban, released March 18, 2009 in Japan, June 29, 2009 in America
- Illustlogic, adapted from Illustlogic DS + Colorful Logic, released April 15, 2009 in Japan
- Illustlogic + Nihon no Mukashi Banashi (イラストロジック＋日本の昔話), adapted from Illustlogic DS + Colorful Logic, released September 30, 2009 in Japan
- Sudoku Sensei, adapted from Sudoku DS: Nikoli no Sudoku Ketteiban, released January 15, 2010 in Europe,

=== Wii PUZZLE Series ===
Games in the Wii PUZZLE Series are:

- Vol. 1: SUDOKU, released March 21, 2007 in Japan. The game features a control scheme in which players use the Wii Remote to point and select a number and insert it into the space.
- Vol. 2: Illustlogic + Colorful Logic (イラストロジック＋からふるロジック), released July 10, 2008 in Japan.

A Crossword game, presumed to be branded as a Puzzle Series game, was announced by Hudson at the Japanese Wii Preview event on September 14, 2006 with a projected release in March 2007, but was never released.

=== Jigsawpuzzle ===
Puzzle Series features a Jigsawpuzzle sub-brand, which includes:

- Jigsawpuzzle: Weekly Puppies Calendar Collection (ジグソーパズルこいぬめくり編, Jigsawpuzzle: Koinu Mekuri Hen) and Jigsawpuzzle: Weekly Kits Calendar Collection (ジグソーパズルこねこめくり編, Jigsawpuzzle: Koneko Mekuri Hen)for the Nintendo DS (both released August 3, 2006 in Japan), based on the Mekuri calendar brand by Japanese company Comin.
- Jigsawpuzzle: Oden-kun (ジグソーパズル おでんくん) (released October 26, 2006 in Japan) and Jigsawpuzzle: Oden-kun 2 (ジグソーパズル おでんくん) (released March 29, 2007 in Japan) for the Nintendo DS based on the picture book franchise The Adventure of Oden-kun by author/illustrator Lily Franky.
- Jigsawpuzzle: Kyo no Wanko (ジグソーパズル きょうのわんこ; "Dog of the Day") for the Wii, based on the "Kyo no Wanko" segment on the Japanese morning show Mezamashi TV. The game was released in Japan on July 26, 2007. For 1-4 players.

Hudson stopped using Jigsawpuzzle branding for jigsaw puzzle games with the announcement of Jigsawpuzzle DS: DS de Meguru Sekai Isan no Tabi as part of a new puzzle series in October 2007.

=== 3DS game ===
In 2011, Hudson released its final puzzle game, a Nintendo 3DS game collection of four Nikoli puzzles: Sudoku, Shikaku, Hashiwokakero and Light Up. It was released in Japan on June 2 as Sudoku to 3-Tsu no Puzzle: Nikoli no Puzzle Variety (数独と3つのパズル～ニコリのパズルバラエティ～; Sudoku and 3 Puzzles: Nikoli Puzzle Variety); in Europe on June 9 as Sudoku – The Puzzle Game Collection; and in America as Nikoli's Pencil Puzzle on October 25.
