= Brain Buster Puzzle Pak =

2006 video game

- North American box art
- Developer: Nikoli
- Publishers: Agetec; Jaleco; 505 Games
- Platform: Nintendo DS
- Release: JP: September 28, 2006; NA: June 15, 2007; EU: August 17, 2007; AU: September 20, 2007
- Genre: Puzzle game
- Mode: Single-player

Brain Buster Puzzle Pak known in Japan as Nemurenai Yoru to Puzzle no Hi ni wa... (眠れない夜とパズルの日には…。, Nemurenai Yoru to Pazuru no Hi ni wa...), is a puzzle video game released for Nintendo DS in Japan, North America, and the PAL region. The game is a compilation of Nikoli puzzle games including Light Up (called Light On), Slitherlink, Sudoku, Nurikabe, and Kakuro.

== Reception ==
Reception

Aggregate score
| Aggregator | Score |
|---|---|
| Metacritic | 72/100 |

Review scores
| Publication | Score |
|---|---|
| Game Informer | 8/10 |
| GameZone | 7/10 |
| IGN | 7/10 |
| NGamer | 75% |

The game received "average" reviews according to the review aggregation website Metacritic. Game Informer gave it a favorable review, about two-and-a-half months before its U.S. release date.
