= Mainarizumu =

Logic-based number puzzle using greater-than and less-than symbols

A 5x5 Mainarizumu puzzle

Mainarizumu (マイナリズム), also known as Minarism, is a type of logic puzzle published by Nikoli.

== Rules ==
Mainarizumu is played on a square grid, typically 7x7 or smaller, with two kinds of clues: a greater-than or less-than sign connecting two adjacent squares, or a circled digit connecting two adjacent squares. The solver is to enter a digit into every square so that:

- No digit is repeated in any row or column (much like in Sudoku puzzles).
- If two squares are connected by a greater-than or less-than sign, then the digits in those squares must obey that inequality.
- If two squares are connected by a circled digit, then the digits in those squares must differ by exactly that amount.

== See also ==
- List of Nikoli puzzle types
