= Maki Kaji =

Japanese puzzle designer and businessman (1951–2021)

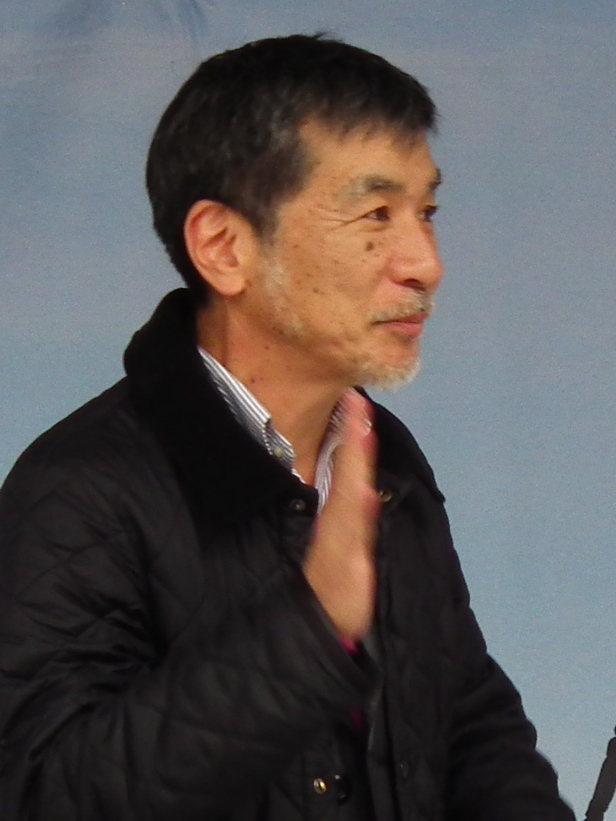
- Kaji in 2011
- Born: 8 October 1951; Sapporo, Japan
- Died: 10 August 2021 (aged 69); Tokyo, Japan

Maki Kaji (鍜治 真起, Kaji Maki, 8 October 1951 – 10 August 2021) was a Japanese businessman who was the president of Nikoli, a puzzle manufacturer. He is widely known as "the father of Sudoku" for his role in popularizing the number game.

== Early life ==
Kaji was born in Sapporo on 8 October 1951. His father worked as an engineer at a telecom company; his mother was employed by a kimono shop. Kaji attended Shakujii High School in his hometown. He later studied literature at Keio University, but dropped out during his first year. After a succession of jobs including being a roadie, a waiter and a construction worker, he started a publishing business.

== Career ==
Kaji launched a quarterly puzzle magazine in 1980 called Nikoli, together with two friends from his childhood. They named the magazine after a race horse that had won the 1980 2000 Guineas Stakes race in Ireland. Three years later, he founded a company under the same name. The magazine, the company's main product, grew to have 50,000 quarterly readers.

The number game Sudoku appeared in early issues of Nikoli. He formulated the name "Sudoku" while he was scrambling to get to a horse race. He shortened it from Suuji wa dokushin ni kagiru ("numbers should be single") at the urging of his fellow workers. After the game spread to Britain and the United States, it became wildly popular.

Kaji also invented or introduced various other puzzle games, such as Masyu. He resigned as head of Nikoli on 31 July 2021, ten days before his death. He was succeeded as president by Nikoli's editor in chief, Yoshinao Anpuku.

== Personal life ==
Kaji was married to Naomi until his death. Together, they had two children.

Kaji died on 10 August 2021 at his home in Tokyo at age 69, from bile duct cancer. Nikoli's staff held a memorial gathering for him on 2 November in Tokyo.
