= Yajisan-Kazusan =

Binary determination logic puzzle published by Nikoli

Yajisan-Kazusan is a binary determination logic puzzle published by Nikoli.

== Rules ==
Yajisan-Kazusan is played on a rectangular grid, the structure of which directly resembles that of Yajilin: Some cells contain numbers with an arrow indicating an orthogonal direction.

Ostensibly, the number indicates the number of shaded cells which appear in the line of the orthogonal direction indicated by the arrow. Shaded cells may not touch orthogonally, and all unshaded cells must form a single, continuous group. However, unlike many of Nikoli's other puzzles, not all of the clue numbers are correct. Some contain values which are obviously impossible, while others simply contradict known values. In Yajisan-Kazusan, part of the solution is determining which clues are incorrect; any cells containing such clues must be shaded. The clue in a shaded square need not conversely be incorrect. Once a clue cell has been shaded, the clue plays no further part in solving the puzzle.

== Solution methods ==
Because there are false clues within the grid, it can be difficult finding a good starting place. Obviously impossible values can work well: Since shaded cells cannot touch orthogonally, only about half of the cells in a row or column may be shaded.

== See also ==
- List of Nikoli puzzle types
