= Str8ts =

Logic puzzle

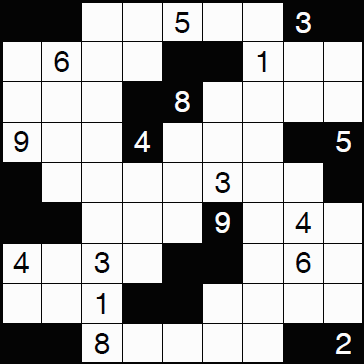
A sample puzzle

Str8ts is a logic-based number-placement puzzle, invented by Jeff Widderich in 2008. It is distinct from, but shares some properties and rules with, Sudoku. The name is derived from the poker straight. The puzzle is published in a number of newspapers internationally, in two book collections, and in downloadable apps. It was featured on the Canadian television show Dragons' Den on November 24, 2010.

== History ==
A hand made prototype of Str8ts which used black cells and the new rule of straights in compartments was invented by Canadian puzzle designer Jeff Widderich in 2007. He approached Andrew Stuart, a UK-based puzzle maker and programmer, to make the puzzle. Their collaboration settled how the clues would be determined and finalized the rules. The first puzzle was presented at the Nuremberg International Toy Fair in February 2008. A daily puzzle has been published at their website since 24 November 2008, and more recently, a weekly "extreme" puzzle has appeared, which incorporates an active discussion forum for each puzzle. The puzzle has appeared in Süddeutsche Zeitung since March 2010, and in the Saturday edition of Die Rheinpfalz since August 2010. An iOS app was released in July 2009, containing hundreds of puzzles in four difficulty levels.

In August 2010, a wooden board and piece version was designed by Intellego holzspiele. Widderich appeared with the game in the fifth season of the Canadian television show Dragons' Den on November 24, 2010, where he made a deal for a $150,000 investment in return for 10% royalties, from three of the panelists.

== Gameplay ==
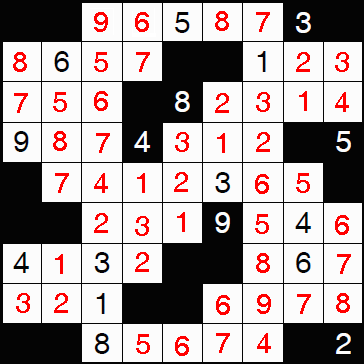
Solution to the sample puzzle

The solver is given a 9x9 grid, partially divided by black cells into compartments. Each compartment, vertically or horizontally, must contain a straight – a set of consecutive numbers, but in any order. For example: 7, 6, 4, 5 is valid, but 1, 3, 8, 7 is not.

Like Sudoku, the solver must fill the remaining white cells with numbers 1 to 9 (or 1 to n in puzzles with N cells per side) such that each row and column contains unique digits. Whereas Sudoku has the additional constraint of 3x3 boxes, in Str8ts rows and columns are divided by black cells. Additional clues are set in some of the black cells – these numbers remove that digit as an option in the row and column. Such digits do not form part of any straight.

There are a number of variants to the basic game, including Symmetric Str8ts, Asymmetric Str8ts, Mini-Str8ts, and Transformations.

== Grading ==
As Str8ts belongs to the same class of puzzles as Sudoku the puzzle can demonstrate a wide spectrum of relative difficulty. The grade is determined by a combination of opportunities to solve at each stage and the difficulty of the strategy that grants each solution. An easier puzzle will have many places where a logical deduction can place a solution or eliminate a candidate number. When the whole puzzle is assessed in this way, plus some heuristics, a score can be determined. Over a large number of puzzles (>10,000) a bell curve of scores can be produced. This can be quartiled to group puzzles into specific grades.

== Publications ==
- Jeff Widderich, Andrew Stuart: STR8TS - Das neue Zahlenrätsel mit Suchtpotential, jezza!Verlag, Geltendorf 2009, ISBN 978-3-941969-00-1
- Jeff Widderich & Andrew Stuart: STR8TS, Süddeutsche Zeitung Verlag, München 2010, ISBN 978-3-86615-810-8
