= Tour puzzle =

Type of puzzle

An animation of an open knight's tour on a 5 × 5 board

A tour puzzle is a puzzle in which the player travels around a board (usually but not necessarily two-dimensional) using a token which represents a character. Maze puzzles are often of this type.

Sometimes the player has more than one token with which to travel. Sometimes certain objects have to be found or retrieved on the way. In the case of large hedge mazes, the player makes the trip themselves instead of a token.

Often there is a given start and finish position for the player's token. Some tour puzzles demand that certain points on the board have to be visited on the way.

== Examples of tour puzzles ==
- knight's tour
- mazes and labyrinths
- mizmazes
- logic mazes
- Hiroimono
