= Hotaru Beam =

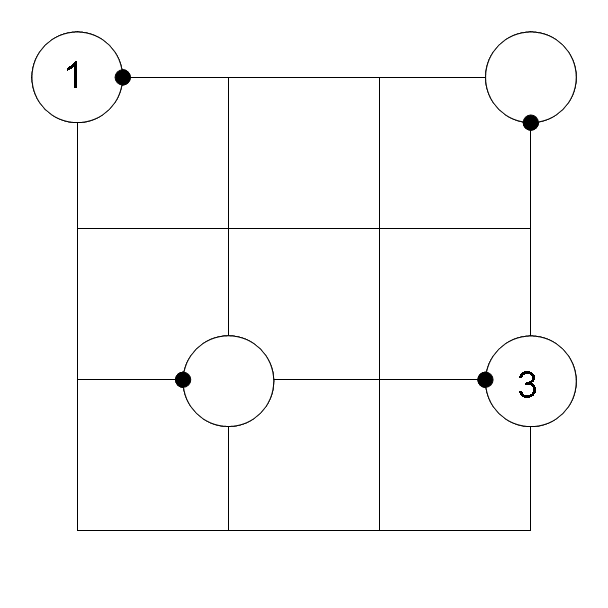
Unsolved Hotaru Beam grid

Hotaru Beam (lit. 'firefly beam') is a binary-determination logic puzzle published by Nikoli.

== Description ==
Hotaru Beam is played on a rectangular grid, usually of dashed lines, in which numbers in circles appear at some of the intersections on the grid. Additionally, each circle has a dot on one of the grid lines leading into the circle.

== Rules ==
1. Draw a line from each black dot to any white circle, following the grid.
2. Lines may not cross or branch.
3. The number on the circle is how many turns the line, drawn from the circle's dot, must make before reaching a circle. If there is no number in the circle, there is no required amount of turns.

== Solution methods ==
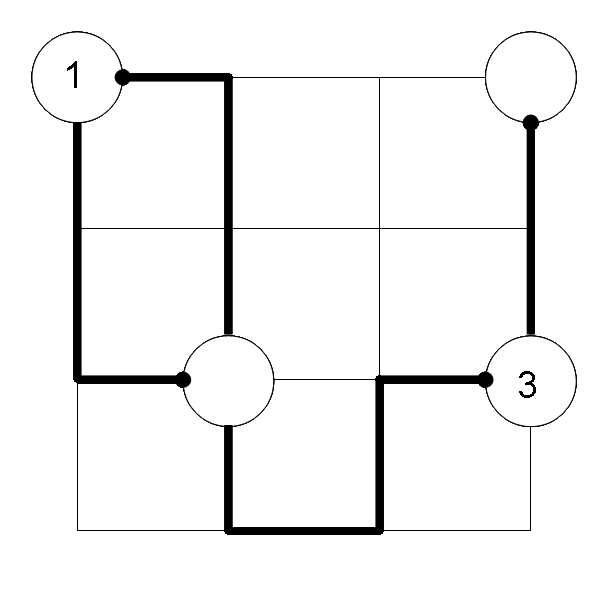
Solution to earlier Hotaru Beam grid

A circle with 0 on it (not the same as a blank circle) is a given: It will have at least one line going straight in the direction of the dot until it hits another circle. Each circle will have a line coming out of it in the direction of the dot. Since turning at the corner of the grid counts as a turn, a 1 circle near the corner may be forced to simply continue along the edge of the grid.

== See also ==
- List of Nikoli puzzle types
