= Puzzle Collection =

Puzzle Collection may refer to:

- Microsoft Entertainment Pack: The Puzzle Collection, a collection of puzzle computer games
- Nintendo Puzzle Collection, a collection of puzzle video games by Nintendo for the Nintendo GameCube home console
- Pokémon Puzzle Collection, a puzzle minigames collection for the Pokémon mini handheld game console
- Puzzle Series, a video game brand by Hudson Soft
