= Stained Glass (puzzle) =

Logic puzzle

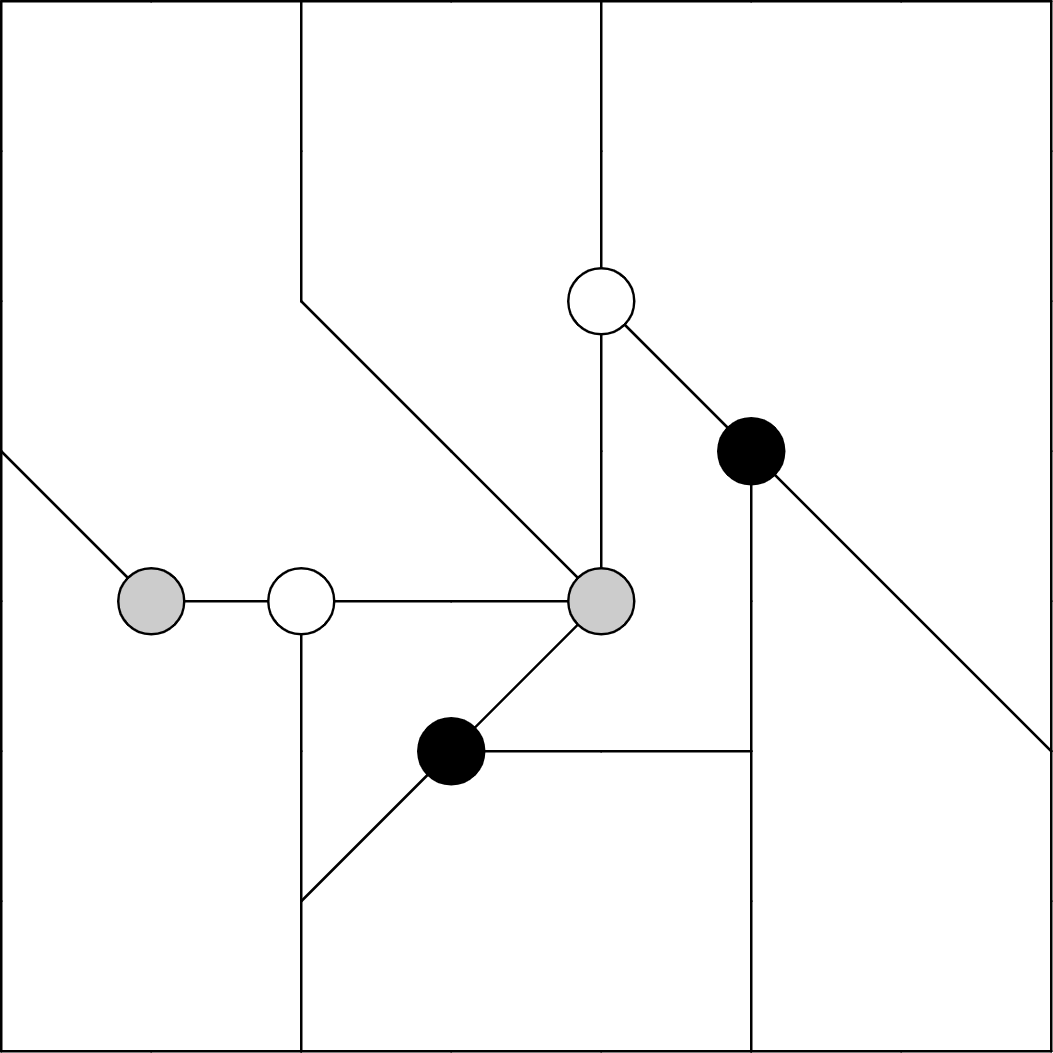
An example stained glass puzzle

Stained Glass is a binary determination logic puzzle published by Nikoli.

== Rules ==
Stained Glass is played on a field of intersecting lines, which may be vertical, horizontal, or diagonal. At some intersections are circles, which are either black, grey, or white.

The aim is to color the shapes such that the following rules are met:

- The white circles touch more white shapes than black shapes.
- The black circles touch more black shapes than white shapes.
- The grey circles touch the same number of black as white shapes.

== Solution methods ==
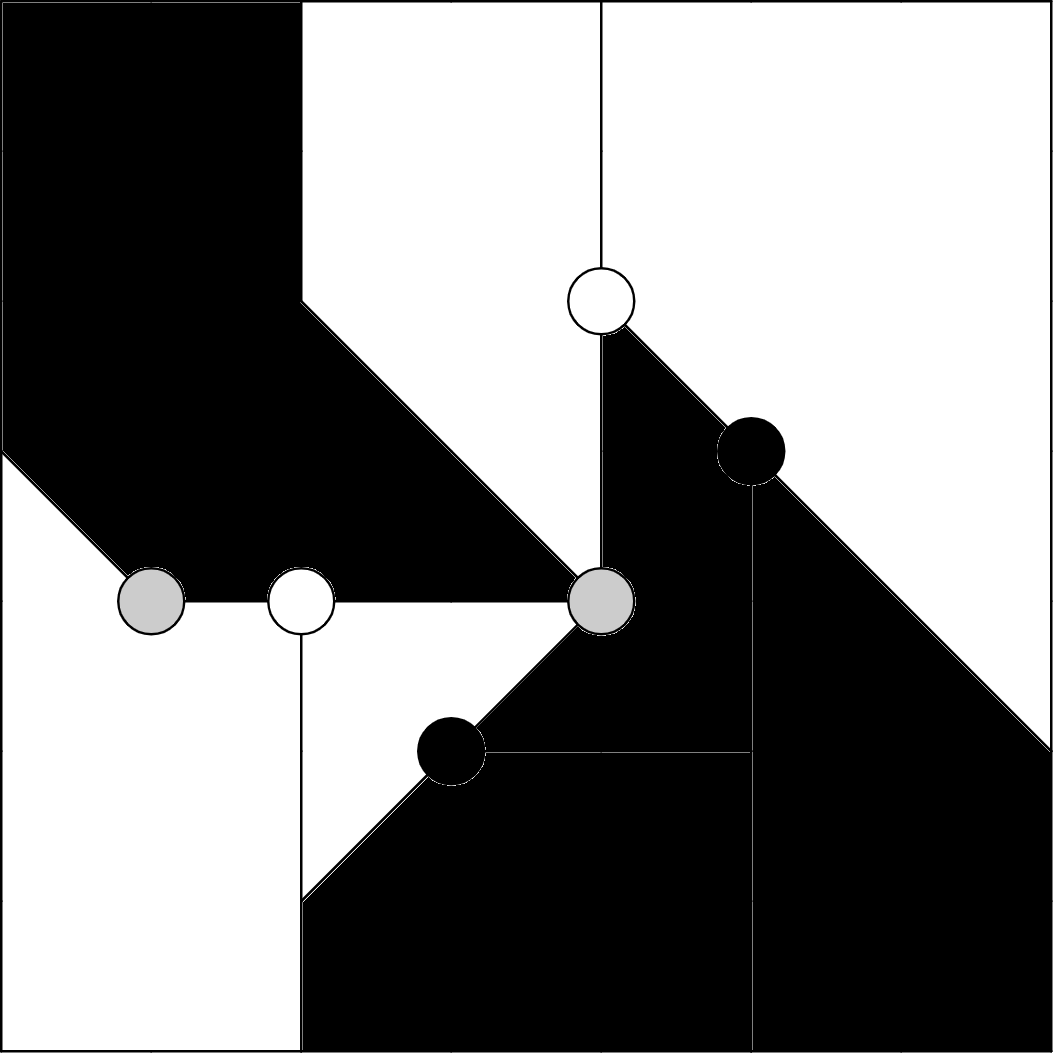
The solved example puzzle

White or black circles bordered by one or two shapes result in all bordering shapes being of the type specified by the circle. Once at least half of the bordering shapes on a grey circle are known to be of one type, the other half should also be known.

== See also ==
- List of Nikoli puzzle types
