= Islands in the Stream =

Islands in the Stream may refer to:

- Islands in the Stream (novel), a novel by Ernest Hemingway, published posthumously in 1970
- Islands in the Stream (film), a 1977 film adaptation of the Hemingway novel starring George C. Scott
- "Islands in the Stream" (song), a 1983 country and pop song, written by the Bee Gees and originally sung by Kenny Rogers and Dolly Parton
- "Islands in the Stream", a 2004 episode of Degrassi: The Next Generation
- Nurikabe (puzzle), a logic puzzle sometimes called Islands in the Stream

== See also ==
- "Islanded in a Stream of Stars", an episode of the reimagined Battlestar Galactica
