= Ripple Effect (puzzle) =

2007 Logic puzzle published by Nikoli

Moderately difficult sample puzzle © 2005-6 Adam R. Wood, licensed under GFDL

Ripple Effect (Japanese:波及効果 Hakyuu Kouka) is a logic puzzle published by Nikoli. As of 2007, two books consisting entirely of Ripple Effect puzzles have been published by Nikoli. The second was published on October 4, 2007.

== Rules ==
Ripple Effect is played on a rectangular grid divided into polyominoes. The solver must place one positive integer into each cell of the grid – some of which may be given in advance – according to these rules:

- Every polyomino must contain the consecutive integers from 1 to the quantity of cells in that polyomino inclusive.
- If two identical numbers appear in the same row or column, at least that many cells with other numbers must separate them. For example, two cells both containing '1' may not be orthogonally adjacent, but must have at least one cell between them with a different number. Two cells marked '3' in the same row or column must have at least three cells with other numbers between them in that row or column, and so on.

== History ==
Ripple Effect is an original puzzle of Nikoli; it first appeared in Puzzle Communication Nikoli #73 (May 1998).

== See also ==
- List of Nikoli puzzle types
- Ripple Effect Puzzle: The mobile game
