= LITS =

Logic puzzle typically played on a 10×10 board

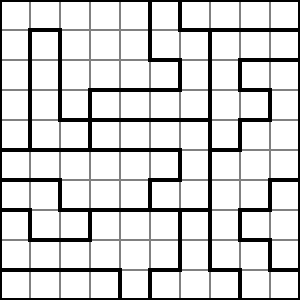
Moderately difficult LITS puzzle (solution)

LITS, formerly known as Nuruomino (ヌルオミノ), is a binary determination puzzle published by Nikoli.

== Rules ==
LITS is played on a rectangular grid, typically 10×10; the grid is divided into polyominoes, none of which have fewer than four cells. The goal is to shade in a tetromino within each pre-printed polyomino in such a way that no two matching tetrominoes are orthogonally adjacent (with rotations and reflections counting as matching), and that the shaded cells form a valid nurikabe: they are all orthogonally contiguous (form a single polyomino) and contain no 2×2 square tetrominoes as subsets.

== History ==
The puzzle was first printed in Puzzle Communication Nikoli #106; the original title is a combination of 'nuru' (Japanese: "to paint") and 'omino' (polyomino). In issue #112, the title was changed to the present one, which represents the four (of five) tetrominoes used in the puzzle: the L-shape, the straight, the T-shape, and the skew (square tetrominoes may never appear in the puzzle as they are a direct violation of the rule).

== Complexity ==
Testing whether a given LITS puzzle has a solution is NP-complete.

== See also ==
- List of Nikoli puzzle types
