= Tatamibari =

Logic puzzle

Tatamibari (Japanese: タタミバリ) is a type of logic puzzle designed and published by Nikoli. The puzzle is based on Japanese tatami mats.

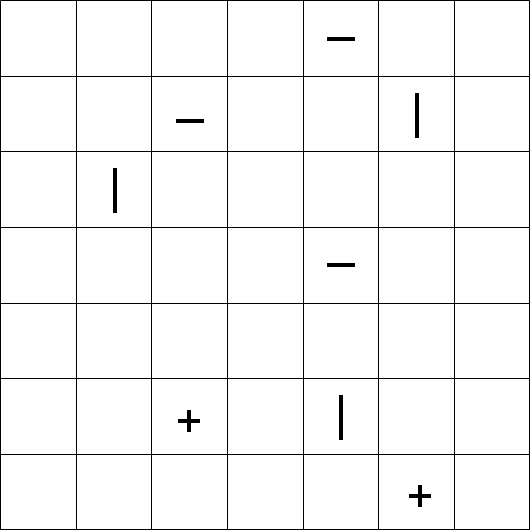
Tatamibari puzzle.

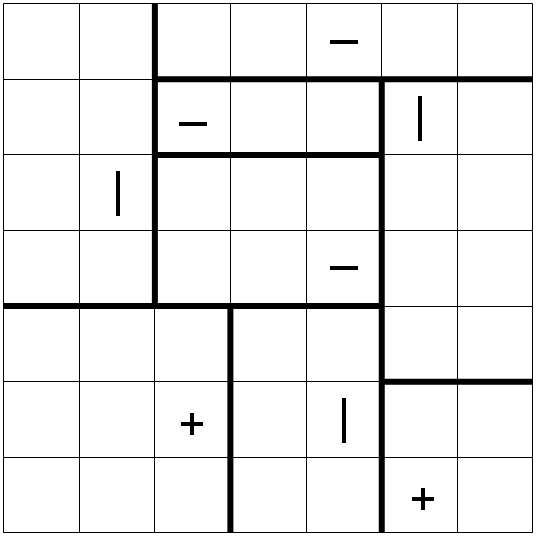
Tatamibari puzzle solved grid

== Rules ==
A Tatamibari puzzle is played on a rectangular grid with three different kinds of symbols in it: +, -. and |. The solver must partition the grid into rectangular or square regions according to the following rules:

- Every partition must contain exactly one symbol in it.
- A + symbol must be contained in a square.
- A | symbol must be contained in a rectangle with a greater height than width.
- A - symbol must be contained in a rectangle with a greater width than height.
- Four pieces may never share the same corner.

== Computational complexity ==
The problem of finding a solution to a particular Tatamibari configuration is NP-complete.

== See also ==
- List of Nikoli puzzle types
