= Yajilin =

Logic puzzle

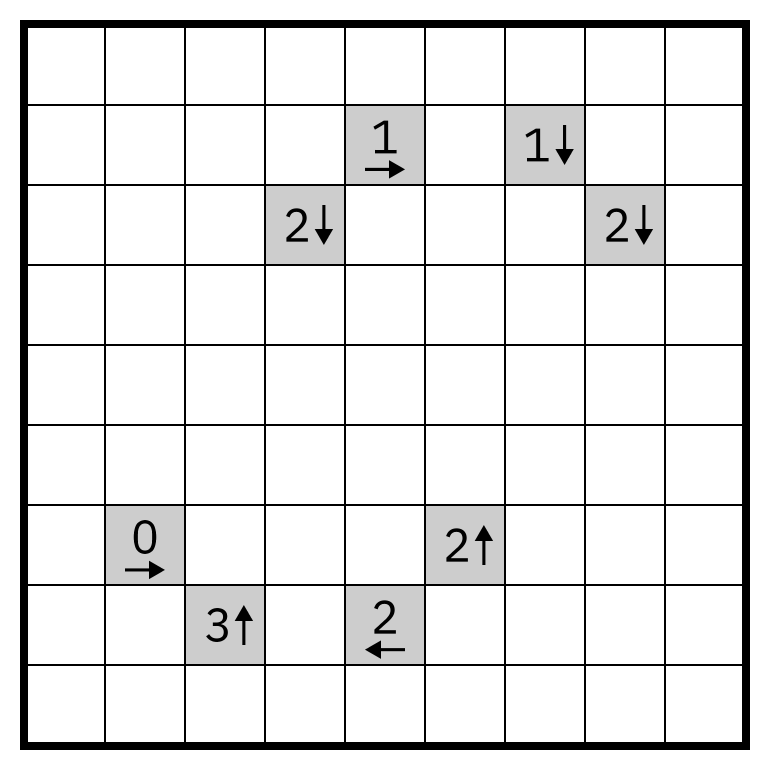
An example of a Yajilin puzzle.

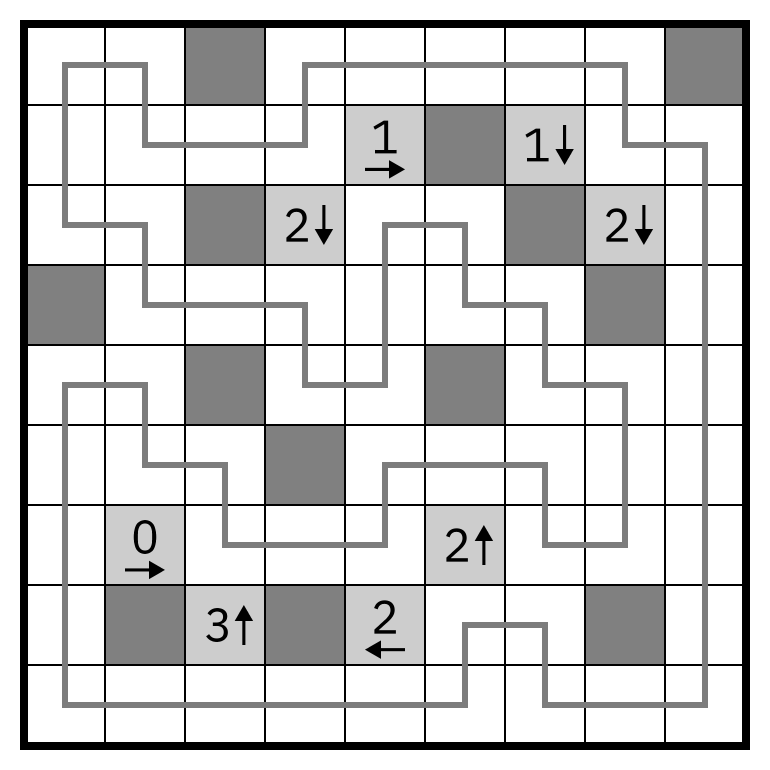
Solved.

Yajilin (ヤジリン) is a type of logic puzzle published by Nikoli. It has been published in English under the name Arrow Ring, such as in the 2005 U.S. qualifier for the World Puzzle Championship.

== Rules ==
Yajilin is played on a rectangular grid of squares. At the beginning, cells are either indicative (containing a number and an arrow pointing "up", "down", "left," or "right") or empty. Black cells, an additional cell type, may be discovered during the solving process.

The goal is to draw a single continuous non-intersecting loop that passes through each cell that is neither black nor indicative. The loop must "enter" each cell from the centre of one of its four sides and "exit" from a different side; all turns are 90 degrees.

For each indicative cell, its number indicates the count of the black cells that lie in that row or column in the direction of its arrow. Indicative cells can never be black, and do not count as a black cell for the purpose of satisfying other indicative cells, although the loop cannot pass through them.

On a solved board,

- Every non-indicative cell is either black or contains a segment of the loop.
- Every indicative cell is accurate. For example, if an indicative cell has an arrow that points to the left and the number '3', there must be exactly 3 black cells to the left of that indicative cell in the same row.
- Black cells do not touch each other orthogonally (they do not share a side).

There may be black cells that are not accounted for by the indicative cells.

== History ==
Yajilin is an original puzzle of Nikoli; it first appeared in Puzzle Communication Nikoli #86 (June 1999). The name is Japanese, in which it is a contraction of ヤジルシ (yajirushi, directing arrow) and リンク (rinku, the English word 'link').

== See also ==
- List of Nikoli puzzle types
