= Blendoku =

2013 video game

- Developer: Lonely Few
- Publisher: Lonely Few
- Engine: Unity
- Platforms: iOS, Android, Kindle
- Release: February 28, 2013 (iOS, Android)
- Genre: Puzzle
- Mode: Single player

Blendoku is a 2013 free puzzle video game for Android and iOS mobile devices developed by Los Angeles–based studio Lonely Few, which was founded by Australian developer Rod Green and Yeong-Hao Han. In Blendoku, players are given a grid of squares, some with colors provided, some not. A palette of additional color tiles is provided. To clear a level, a player must "fill in" the empty squares from the palette in such a way as to create smooth sequences of colors both horizontally and vertically. The game includes 475 levels, and additional levels are available as separate purchases.

Green and Han acknowledged that the game is not accessible to people with a variety of types of color-blindness and were working on a solution.

== Reception ==
Kotaku called it "Unique and addictive". Gamezebo called it "A brilliantly simple yet challengingly in-depth twist on classic Sudoku." but stated that it's a "tablet game" because many puzzles are too small to play on a phone,
