= Dropquote =

Word puzzle

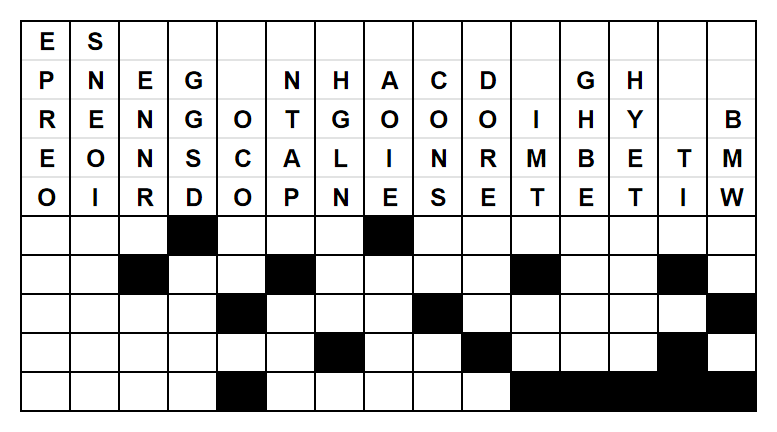
A dropquote puzzle

Dropquote or quotefall is a puzzle type where a quotation has been written over several lines, and the solver must recreate it from only a list of letters as they should appear in each column. When correctly completed, the words read from left to right to form a quotation, proverb or saying.

The upper half of the puzzle consists of columns with letters. These letters should fall from the letter column perpendicular to the bottom of the diagram. The given column letters are sometimes given in alphabetical order. The words of the quote are separated by black boxes. A word that is broken at the end of a line continues on the next line. Diagram boxes containing punctuation or numbers are not filled with letters. When the quote puzzle is filled in, there are no letters left.

With simple quotation puzzles, a few letters or punctuation marks may have been entered in advance. There are also quote puzzles without black boxes in the solution field.

Dropquotes can be combined with a crossword puzzle or cryptic crossword. Here, solution letters of the crossword puzzle or the cryptogram can be transferred to the quote puzzle.

The earliest known publication was by Pierre Berloquin in 100 Jeux et Casse-tête in 1975.

With geocaching puzzles, coordinates can be hidden in a quote puzzle.

== Solving strategy ==
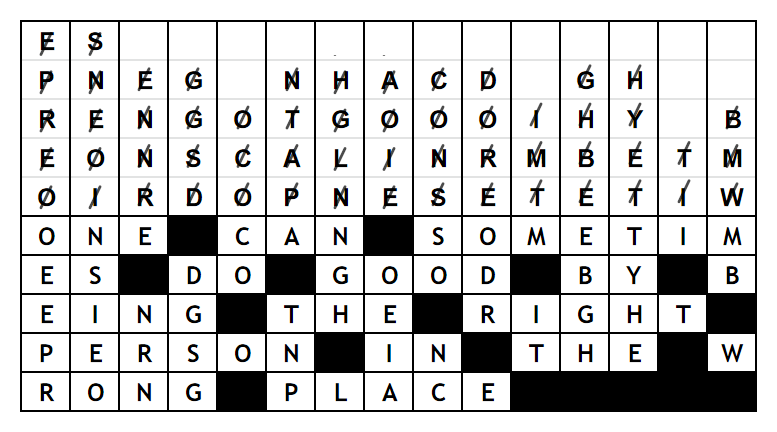
The solution to the earlier puzzle

To find a start you can search for:

- short columns
- columns with double letters
- short words
- words that fit logically in the sentence
- common word parts (eg. ending "ING" or "ES")
- letters that logically connect with other column letters
- links with already solved words
- combinations of the above methods

Already 'fallen' column letters can be crossed out.
