= Slitherlink =

Logic puzzle

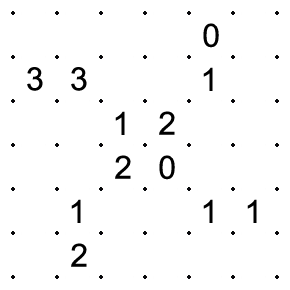
Moderately difficult Slitherlink puzzle (solution)

Slitherlink (also known as Sli-Lin, Fences, Takegaki, Loop the Loop, Loopy, Ouroboros, Suriza, Rundweg, Tectonic and Dotty Dilemma) is a logic puzzle developed by publisher Nikoli.

== Rules ==
Slitherlink is played on a rectangular lattice of dots. Some of the squares formed by the dots have numbers inside them. The objective is to connect horizontally and vertically adjacent dots so that the lines form a simple loop with no loose ends. In addition, the number inside a square represents how many of its four sides are segments in the loop.

Other types of planar graphs can be used in lieu of the standard grid, with varying numbers of edges per vertex or vertices per polygon. These patterns include snowflake, Penrose, Laves and Altair tilings. These add complexity by varying the number of possible paths from an intersection, and/or the number of sides to each polygon; but similar rules apply to their solution.

== History ==
Slitherlink is an original puzzle of Nikoli; it first appeared in Puzzle Communication Nikoli #26 (June 1989). The editor combined two original puzzles contributed there. At first, every square contained a number and the edges did not have to form a loop.

== Video games ==
Slitherlink puzzles have been featured in video games on several platforms. A game titled Slither Link was published in Japan by Bandai for the Wonderswan portable console in 2000. Slitherlink puzzles were included alongside Sudoku and Nonogram puzzles in the Loppi Puzzle Magazine: Kangaeru Puzzle series of games from Success for the Game Boy Nintendo Power cartridge in 2001. Slitherlink games were also featured for the Nintendo DS handheld game console, with Hudson Soft releasing Puzzle Series Vol. 5: Slitherlink in Japan on November 16, 2006, and Agetec including Slitherlink in its Nikoli puzzle compilation, Brain Buster Puzzle Pak, released in North America on June 17, 2007.

== See also ==
- List of Nikoli puzzle types
- Category:Logic puzzles
