= Nikoli (publisher) =

Japanese puzzle publisher and magazine

- Founded: 1980; 46 years ago
- Founder: Maki Kaji
- Country of origin: Japan
- Publication types: Puzzles, Magazines
- Official website: nikoli.co.jp

Nikoli Co., Ltd. (Japanese: 株式会社ニコリ, Hepburn: Kabushiki-gaisha; Nikori) is a Japanese publisher that specializes in games and, especially, logic puzzles. Nikoli is also the nickname of a quarterly magazine (whose full name is Puzzle Communication Nikoli) issued by the company in Tokyo. Nikoli was established in 1980, and became prominent worldwide with the popularity of Sudoku.

The name "Nikoli" comes from the racehorse who won the Irish 2,000 Guineas in 1980; the founder of Nikoli, Maki Kaji, was fond of horseracing and betting.

Nikoli is notable for its vast library of "culture independent" puzzles. An example of a language/culture-dependent genre of puzzle would be the crossword, which relies on a specific language and alphabet. For this reason Nikoli's puzzles are often purely logical, and often numerical.

Nikoli's Sudoku, the most popular logic problem in Japan, was popularized in the English-speaking world in 2005, though that game has a history stretching back hundreds of years and across the globe.

The magazine has invented several new genres of puzzles, and introduced several new games to Japan.

== Nikoli puzzles ==
An uncompleted Hitori puzzle

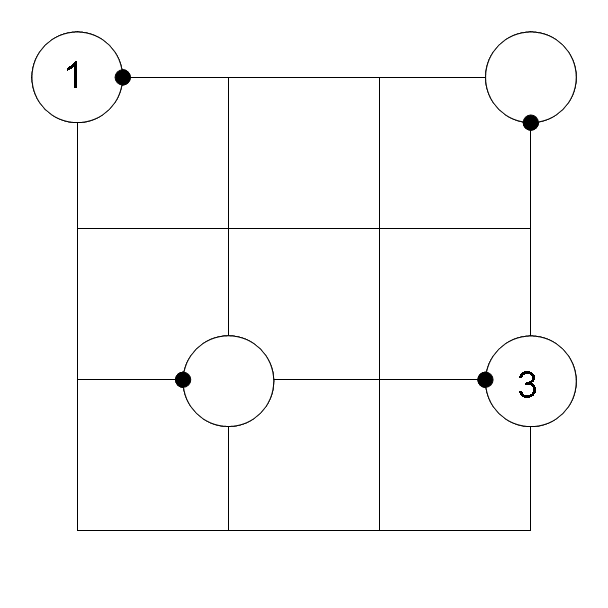
A Hotaru Beam puzzle

A Sudoku puzzle

Some of the popular Nikoli puzzles, along with their Japanese names; terms in parentheses are published English titles for the same puzzles.

- Bag (バッグ, baggu) (Corral)
- Connect the dots (点つなぎ, ten tsunagi) (dot to dots)
- Country Road (カントリーロード, kantorī rōdo)
- Crossword (クロスワードパズル, kurosuwādo pazuru)
  - Cipher crossword (ナンクロ, nankuro)
- Edel (エデル, ederu) (Paint by Numbers, Nonogram, Griddler)
- Fillomino (フィルオミノ, firuomino) (Allied Occupation)
- Gokigen Naname (ごきげんななめ, gokigen naname) (Slant)
- Goishi Hiroi (碁石ひろい, goishi hiroi) (Go Stones)
- Hashiwokakero (橋をかけろ, hashi o kakero) (Bridges)
- Heyawake (へやわけ, heyawake)
- Hitori (ひとりにしてくれ, hitori ni shitekure)
- Hotaru Beam (ホタルビーム, hotaru bīmu)
- Inshi no heya (因子の部屋, inshi no heya)
- Kakuro (カックロ, kakkuro) (Cross Sums, Kakro)
- Keisuke (ケイスケ, keisuke)
- Kin-Kon-Kan (キンコンカン, kinkonkan)
- Kuromasu (黒マスはどこだ, kuromasu wa dokoda)
- Light Up (美術館, bijutsukan)
- LITS (ヌルオミノ, nuruomino)
- Mainarizumu (マイナリズム, mainarizumu)
- Masyu (ましゅ, mashu)
- Maze (迷路, meiro)
  - Picture maze (浮き出し迷路, ukidashi meiro)
- Mochikoro (モチコロ, mochikoro)
- Nondango
- Numberlink (ナンバーリンク, nanbā rinku)
- Nurikabe (ぬりかべ, nurikabe) (Cell Structure)
- Reflect Link (リフレクトリンク, refurekuto rinku)
- Ripple Effect (波及効果, hakyū kōka)
- Shakashaka (シャカシャカ, shakashaka)
- Shikaku (四角に切れ, shikaku ni kire) (Divide by Squares)
- Slitherlink (スリザーリンク, surizā rinku) (Fences)
- Stained Glass (ステンドグラス, sutendo gurasu)
- Sto-stone (ストストーン, sutosutōn)
- Sudoku (数独, sūdoku) (Number Place, Nine Numbers)
- Tatamibari (タタミバリ, tatami bari)
- Tatebo-Yokobo (タテボーヨコボー, tatebō yokobō)
- Tentai Show (天体ショー, tentai shō) (Galaxies)
- Tile Paint (タイルペイント, tairu peinto)
- Verbal arithmetic (ふくめん算, fukumensan) (Alphametics, Cryptarithm)
- Word search (シークワーズ, shīku wādo) (Word seek)
- Yajilin (ヤジリン, yajirin) (Arrow Ring)
- Yajisan-Kazusan (やじさんかずさん, yajisan kazusan)
