= Shikaku =

Logic puzzle

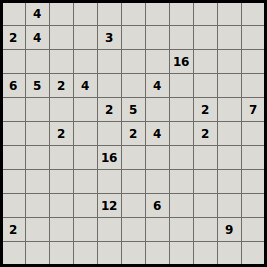
An initial configuration.

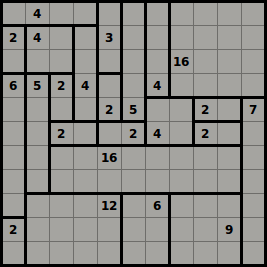
A solution.

Shikaku (四角に切れ, Shikaku ni Kire; also anglicised as Divide by Box or Rectangles) is a logic puzzle published by Nikoli.

== History ==
The game was invented by Yoshinao Anpuku, a math student at the University of Kyoto, in 1989 and published by Japanese games magazine Nikoli under the name "Shikaku". The puzzle later spread to other publications and has been adapted into video games.

== Rules ==
Shikaku is played on a rectangular grid. Some of the squares in the grid are numbered. The objective is to divide the grid into rectangular and square pieces such that each piece contains exactly one number, and that number represents the area of the rectangle.

== Computational complexity ==
Determining whether a given instance of Shikaku has a valid solution has been proven to be NP-complete.

== See also ==
- List of Nikoli puzzle types
