= Light Up (puzzle) =

Logic puzzle

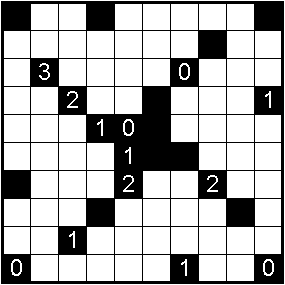
Moderately difficult Light Up puzzle (solution)

Light Up (Japanese: 美術館 bijutsukan, art gallery), also called Akari (明かり, light) is a binary-determination logic puzzle published by Nikoli. As of 2011, three books consisting entirely of Light Up puzzles have been published by Nikoli.

== Rules ==
Light Up is played on a rectangular grid of white and black cells. The player places light bulbs in white cells such that no two bulbs shine on each other, until the entire grid is lit up. A bulb sends rays of light horizontally and vertically, illuminating its entire row and column unless its light is blocked by a black cell. A black cell may have a number on it from 0 to 4, indicating how many bulbs must be placed adjacent to its four sides; for example, a cell with a 4 must have four bulbs around it, one on each side, and a cell with a 0 cannot have a bulb next to any of its sides. An unnumbered black cell may have any number of light bulbs adjacent to it, or none. Bulbs placed diagonally adjacent to a numbered cell do not contribute to the bulb count.

== Solution methods ==
A typical starting point in the solution of a Light Up puzzle is to find a black cell with a 4, or a cell with a smaller number that is blocked on one or more sides (for example, a 3 against a wall or a 2 in a corner) and therefore has only one configuration of surrounding bulbs. After this step, other numbered cells may be illuminated on one or more sides, narrowing down the possible bulb configurations around them, and in some cases making only one configuration possible.

Another common technique is to look for a cell that is not yet lit, and determine if there is only one possible cell in which a bulb can be placed to light it up.

When it is unclear where to place a bulb, one may also place dots in white cells that cannot have bulbs, such as around a 0 or in places where a bulb would create a contradiction. For example, a light bulb placed diagonally adjacent to a 3 will block two of its surrounding cells, making it impossible to have three bulbs around it; therefore, the diagonal cells around a 3 can never have lights in them and can be always dotted. Similarly, one may put dots in places where a bulb would "trap" another unlit cell, making it impossible to light it up without breaking the rules.

More advanced techniques tend to focus on different combinations of clues. Two 3s that are one space apart, for example, with nothing between them or to the other two sides of the cell in between, must have a lightbulb in that space, and the two spaces next to the two threes, on the line joining them. If not, then one would have two lightbulbs illuminating each other. Also, from this deduction, the remaining four cells surrounding the threes must contain two lightbulbs. Note that as the four spaces are arranged in two rows with nothing in between, one must have one lightbulb to each row, so one can mark all other spaces in those rows as empty.

Another fairly common pattern is a 1 diagonally adjacent to a 2, with one of the spaces next to the 2 but not adjacent to the 1 either empty or walled off. At most one lightbulb can be placed in the two cells common to the two clues, so the last lightbulb must go in the last space around the 2. Now, it is known that there is exactly one lightbulb in those cells, so the other cells next to the 1 must both be empty.

The fact that the puzzle has a unique solution allows for additional deductions. For example, there may be a long area on a border, with multiple black squares one space away. Placing the light by any of them will light up the exact same squares. Since there is exactly one solution, a bulb in any of them would be a contradiction. All such squares may be eliminated immediately. Another common deduction involves a rectangle, with none of the four corners next to a numbered black square. If bulbs are placed in opposite corners, the lighting pattern is the same either way. If one side of the rectangle is guaranteed to have a light, the corners on the other side may be eliminated, even though the location of the light on the guaranteed side isn't known yet.

== Computational complexity ==
Determining whether a given Light Up puzzle is solvable is NP-complete. This is proved by a polynomial-time reduction from Circuit-SAT, which is known to be NP-complete, to Light Up puzzles.

Variations on the original Light Up puzzle in which there are walls without numbers plus walls with one certain number, so either 0, 1, 2, 3 or 4 (we call these variations Akari-$n$), have also been researched in complexity. It is shown, by a polynomial-time reduction from Circuit-SAT, that Akari-1, Akari-2 and Akari-3 are NP-complete; for Akari-4 and puzzles without any numbers it is shown that these are in P; Akari-0 is thus far uncategorized.

== See also ==
- List of Nikoli puzzle types
- Category:Logic puzzles
