= Nurikabe (puzzle) =

Logic puzzle

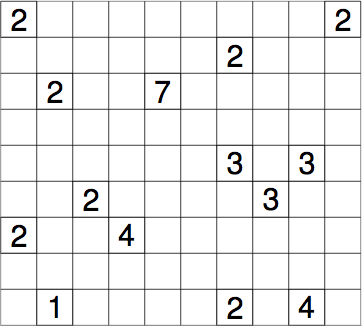
Example of a moderately difficult 10x9 Nurikabe puzzle

Nurikabe (hiragana: ぬりかべ) is a binary determination puzzle named for Nurikabe, an invisible wall in Japanese folklore that blocks roads and delays foot travel. Nurikabe was apparently invented and named by the publisher Nikoli; other names (and attempts at localization) for the puzzle include Cell Structure and Islands in the Stream.

== Rules ==
The puzzle is played on a typically rectangular grid of cells, some of which contain numbers. Cells are initially of unknown color, but can only be black or white. Two same-color cells are considered "connected" if they are adjacent vertically or horizontally (touching diagonally doesn't count). Connected white cells form "islands", while connected black cells form the "sea".

The challenge is to paint each cell black or white, subject to the following rules:

1. Each numbered cell is an island cell, the number in it is the number of cells in that island.
2. Each island must contain exactly one numbered cell.
3. There must be only one sea, which is not allowed to contain "pools", i.e. 2×2 areas of black cells.

Human solvers typically dot the non-numbered cells they've determined to be certain to belong to an island.

Like most other pure-logic puzzles, a unique solution is expected, and a grid containing random numbers is highly unlikely to provide a uniquely solvable Nurikabe puzzle.

== History ==
Nurikabe was first developed by "renin (れーにん)," whose pen name is the Japanese pronunciation of "Lenin" and whose autonym can be read as such, in the 33rd issue of (Puzzle Communication) Nikoli at March 1991. It soon created a sensation, and has appeared in all issues of that publication from the 38th to the present.

As of 2005, seven books consisting entirely of Nurikabe puzzles have been published by Nikoli.

== Solution methods ==
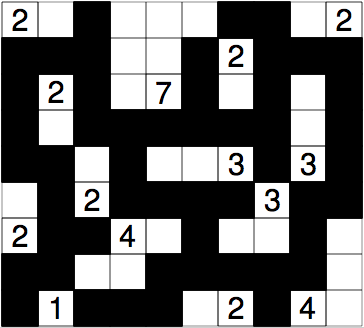
Solution to the example puzzle given above

No blind guessing should be required to solve a Nurikabe puzzle. Rather, a series of simple procedures and rules can be developed and followed, assuming the solver is sufficiently observant to find where to apply them.

The greatest mistake made by beginning solvers is to concentrate solely on determining black or white and not the other; most Nurikabe puzzles require going back and forth. Marking white cells may force other cells to be black lest a section of black be isolated, and vice versa. (Those familiar with Go can think of undetermined cells next to various regions as "liberties" and apply "atari" logic to determine how they must grow.)

=== Basic strategy ===
A Nurikabe puzzle being solved by a human. Dots represent the cells that are known to be white.

- Since two islands may only touch at corners, cells between two partial islands (numbers and adjacent white cells that don't total their numbers yet) must be black. This is often a way to start a Nurikabe puzzle, by marking cells adjacent to two or more numbers as black.
- Once an island is "complete"—that is, it has all the white cells its number requires—all cells that share a side with it must be black. Obviously, any cells marked with '1' at the outset are complete islands unto themselves, and can be isolated with black at the beginning.
- Whenever three black cells form an "elbow"—an L-shape—the cell in the bend (diagonally in from the corner of the L) must be white. (The alternative is a "pool", for lack of a better term.)
- All black cells must eventually be connected. If there is a black region with only one possible way to connect to the rest of the board, the sole connecting pathway must be black.
  - Corollary: there cannot be a continuous path, using either vertical, horizontal or diagonal steps, of white cells from one cell lying on the edge of the board to a different cell like that, that encloses some black cells inside, because otherwise, the black cells won't be connected.
- All white cells must eventually be part of exactly one island. If there is a white region that does not contain a number, and there is only one possible way for it to connect to a numbered white region, the sole connecting pathway must be white.
- Some puzzles will require the location of "unreachables"—cells that cannot be connected to any number, being either too far away from all of them or blocked by other numbers. Such cells must be black. Often, these cells will have only one route of connection to other black cells or will form an elbow whose required white cell (see previous bullet) can only reach one number, allowing further progress.

=== Advanced strategy ===
An example of the third advanced strategy. The cell diagonally between the two islands has to be black.

- If there is a square consisting of two black cells and two unknown cells, at least one of the two unknown cells must remain white according to the rules. Thus, if one of those two unknown cells (call it 'A') can only be connected to a numbered square by way of the other one (call it 'B'), then B must necessarily be white (and A may or may not be white).
- If an island of size N already has N-1 white cells identified, and there are only two remaining cells to choose from, and those two cells touch at their corners, then the cell between those two that is on the far side of the island must be black.
- If a square must be white and only two islands can connect to it and have no unidentified cells left after connecting, then if the islands connect at a 90-degree angle (ex: One island can connect to the top side and the other to the right side) the cell inside the angle (The one touching the top-left corner of the white square in the previous example) must be black to avoid connecting the 2 islands.
- Undetermined cells adjacent to a straight row (or a straight column) of black cells can be tested for being black, because if they are black it will form two elbows, and there will be two adjacent white cells which need to be reachable from the islands. If they can not be fulfilled within the constraints, it means the cell that was probed for blackness must be white.

== Computational complexity ==
It is NP-complete to solve Nurikabe, even when the involved numbers are 1 and 2 only.

Further, consider these two rules of Nurikabe:

1. Black cells form a connected area
2. Black cells cannot form 2 × 2 squares,

Either one can be ignored, giving a total of three variants. As it turns out, they are all NP-complete.

== Related puzzles ==
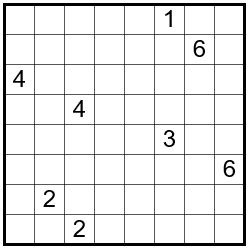
An example 8x8 Mochikoro puzzle.

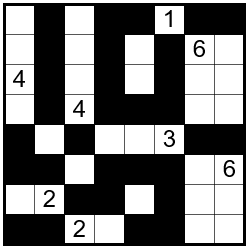
Solution to the previous puzzle.

The binary determination puzzles LITS and Mochikoro, also published by Nikoli, are similar to Nurikabe and employ similar solution methods. The binary determination puzzle Atsumari is similar to Nurikabe but based upon a hexagonal tiling rather than a square tiling.

Mochikoro is a variant of the Nurikabe puzzle:

1. Each numbered cell belongs to a white area, the number indicates how many cells belong to the white area. Some white areas may not include a numbered cell.
2. All white areas must be diagonally connected.
3. The black cell must not cover an area of 2x2 cells or larger.

== See also ==
- Minesweeper
- Hashiwokakero
- List of Nikoli puzzle types
