= Logic puzzle =

Puzzle deriving from the mathematical field of deduction

A logic puzzle is a puzzle deriving from the mathematical field of deduction.

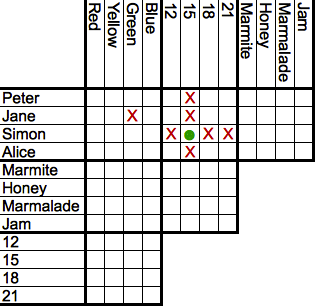
A logic puzzle grid. The only information filled in is that only Simon is 15 and Jane does not like the color green.

== History ==
The logic puzzle was first produced by Charles Lutwidge Dodgson, who is better known under his pen name Lewis Carroll, the author of Alice's Adventures in Wonderland. In his book, The Game of Logic, he introduced a game to solve problems such as confirming the conclusion "Some greyhounds are not fat" from the statements "No fat creatures run well" and "Some greyhounds run well". Puzzles like this, where we are given a list of premises and asked what can be deduced from them, are known as syllogisms. Dodgson goes on to construct much more complex puzzles consisting of up to eight premises.

In the second half of the 20th century, mathematician Raymond M. Smullyan continued and expanded the branch of logic puzzles with books such as The Lady or the Tiger?, To Mock a Mockingbird, and Alice in Puzzle-Land. He popularized the "knights and knaves" puzzles, which involve knights, who always tell the truth, and knaves, who always lie.

There are also logic puzzles that are completely non-verbal in nature. Some popular forms include Sudoku, which involves using deduction to correctly place numbers in a grid; the nonogram, also called "Paint by Numbers", which involves using deduction to correctly fill in a grid with black-and-white squares to produce a picture; and logic mazes, which involve using deduction to figure out the rules of a maze.

== Logic grid puzzles ==
Another form of logic puzzle, popular among puzzle enthusiasts and available in magazines dedicated to the subject, is a format in which the set-up to a scenario is given, as well as the object (for example, determine who brought what dog to a dog show, and what breed each dog was), certain clues are given ("neither Misty nor Rex is the German Shepherd"), and then the reader fills out a matrix with the clues and attempts to deduce the solution. These are often referred to as "logic grid" puzzles. The data set of a logic grid puzzles can be any number of categories, but are limited by the corresponding increase in complexity, with most having only two, three, or even four categories.

While designed more as a table-based puzzle than a matrix, the most famous example of a logic-grid puzzle may be the so-called Zebra Puzzle, which asks the question Who Owned the Zebra?.

Common in logic puzzle magazines are derivatives of the logic grid puzzle called "table puzzles" that are deduced in the same manner as grid puzzles, but lack the grid either because a grid would be too large, or because some other visual aid is provided. For example, a map of a town might be present in lieu of a grid in a puzzle about the location of different shops.

== See also ==
- Category:Logic puzzles, a list of different logic puzzles
- List of puzzle video games
- Logic programming
- Mechanical puzzle
- Recreational mathematics
- Muddy Children Puzzle
- Survo puzzle
- Murdle

== Sources ==
- Carroll, Lewis (1886). The Game of Logic. London: Macmillan.
