= Glossary of sudoku =

A sudoku

This is a glossary of sudoku terms and jargon. Sudoku with a 9×9 grid is assumed, unless otherwise noted.

== Terminology and grid layout ==
A sudoku (i.e. the puzzle) is a partially completed grid. A grid has 9 rows, 9 columns and 9 boxes, each having 9 cells (81 total). Boxes can also be called blocks or regions. Three horizontally adjacent blocks are a band, and three vertically adjacent blocks are a stack. The initially defined values are clues or givens. An ordinary sudoku (i.e. a proper sudoku) has one solution. Rows, columns and regions can be collectively referred to as groups, of which the grid has 27. The One Rule encapsulates the three prime rules, i.e. each digit (or number) can occur only once in each row, column, and box; and can be compactly stated as: "Each digit appears once in each group."

=== Other terminology ===
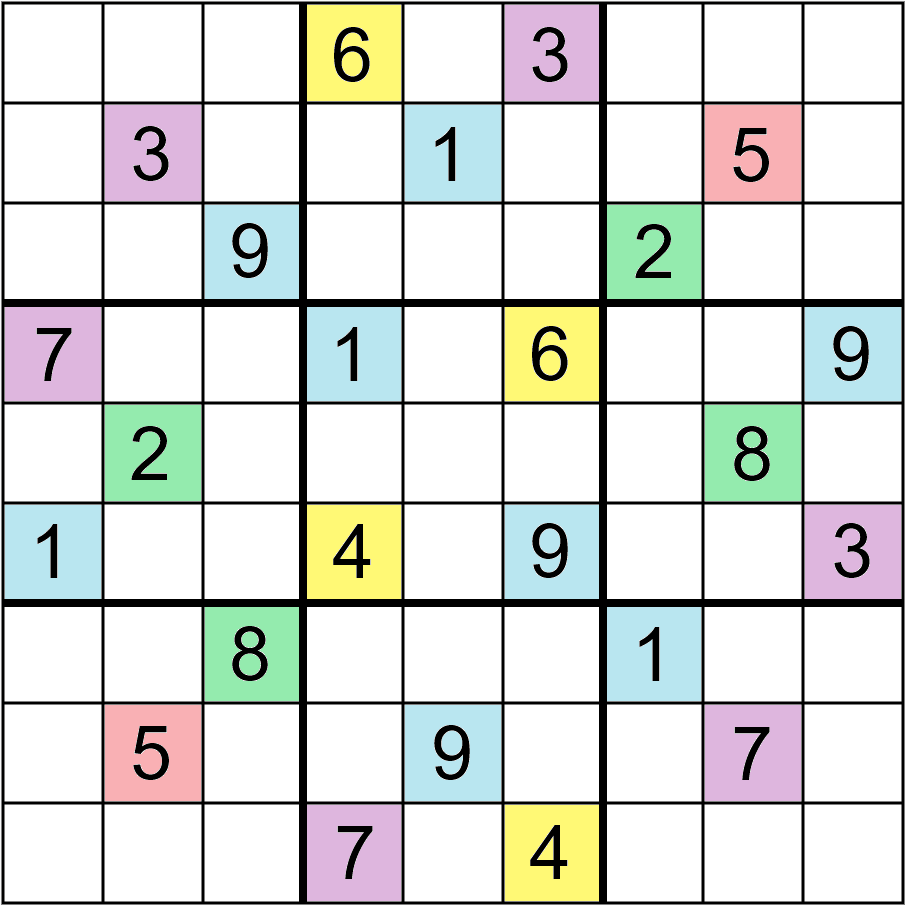
An automorphic sudoku. (also displays dihedral symmetry), (24 clues).

- Automorphic – A property of some sudokus where the digits (not just their positions) play a role in a type of symmetry.
- Backtracking – A programming method to solve sudokus, but can also describe a manual method. In the manual form, it indicates the effort of making a guess, and if found to be wrong, going back (i.e. backtracking) and making a different guess. In solving most sudokus, this is usually a poor approach, but in the most difficult examples may be necessary.
- Constraints – The rules of a sudoku that require each digit to appear only once in each row, column, and box.
- Element – A digit or number of the sudoku. This term is often used in a mathematical context, especially for sudokus larger than 9×9, when more than nine digits "1-9" are required. In large sudokus, such as "Sudoku the Giant", elements may be alphanumeric, or a larger set of numbers, e.g. "1-25".
- Latin square – A related puzzle, or number array, with only row and column constraints (omitting the box constraint).
- Minimal – A minimal sudoku (or irreducible sudoku) is a sudoku from which no clue can be removed leaving it a proper sudoku (has one solution). Different minimal sudokus can have a different number of clues.
- Minimum number of clues – Refers to the minimum of all proper sudokus. (See Mathematics of Sudoku § Minimum number of givens for details).
- Nonet – Another term for the boxes or regions of a sudoku. In some variants nonets are not equally shaped.
- Proper sudoku – A sudoku with one solution. Sudokus are always expected to be proper sudokus unless the puzzle setter specifies otherwise.
- Region – Another term for the boxes of a sudoku. In some variants regions are not equally shaped.
- Satisfactory puzzle – A puzzle that does not require trial and error (guessing). Note: the level of trial and error is usually not explicitly defined.
- Size – Refers to the size of a puzzle or grid, and can be described as a composite (i.e. 9×9), or the number of cells (i.e. 81).

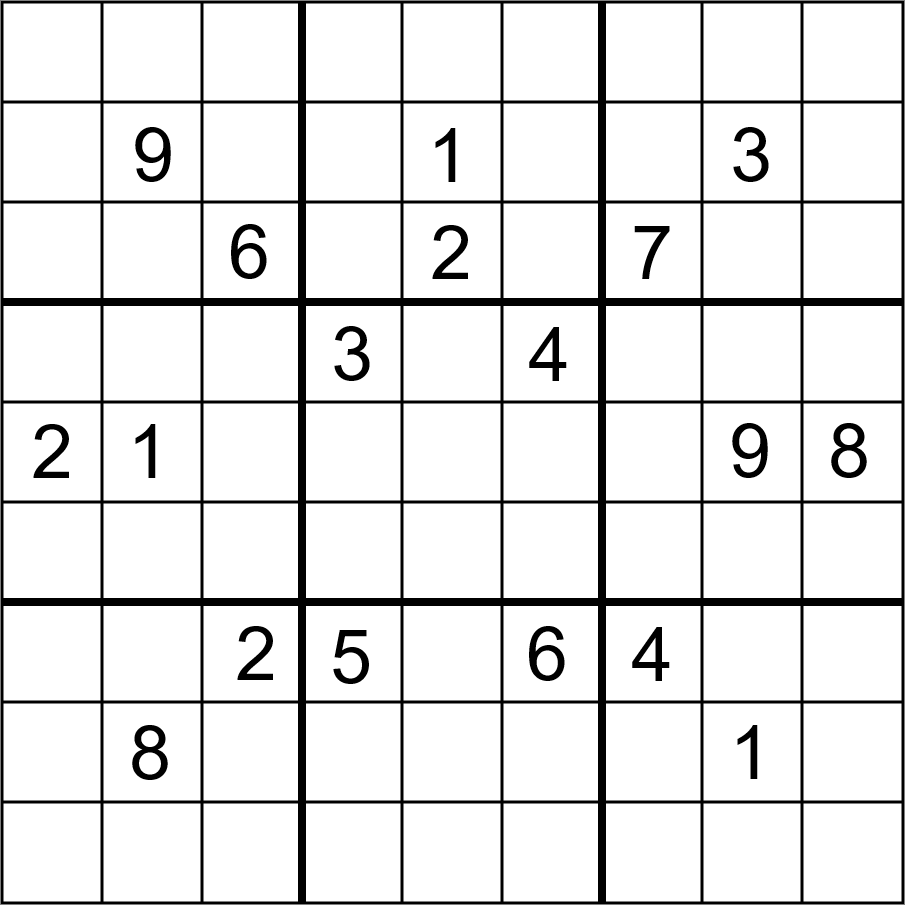
Reflection symmetry on one orthogonal axis (18 clues).

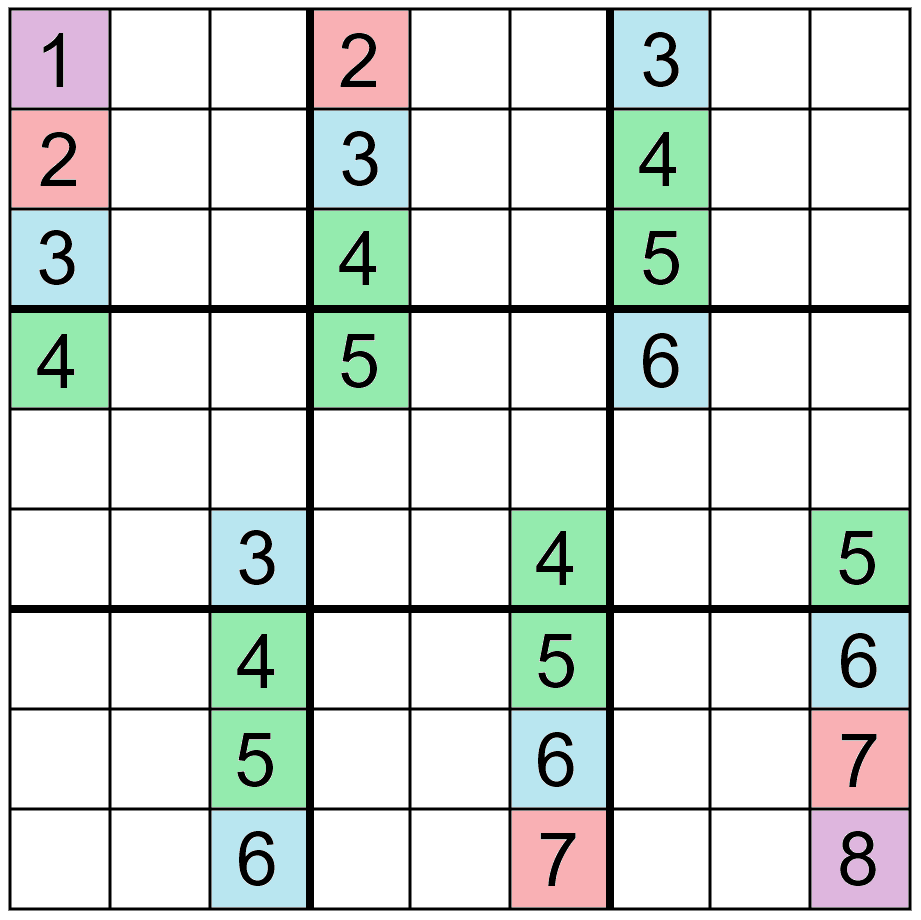
Translational symmetry (each clue group takes the form n, n+1, n+2, n+3), (24 clues).

- Symmetry – A sudoku can have seven types of overall symmetry in its clue positions. They include:
  1. 90° rotational symmetry.
  2. 180° rotational symmetry.
  3. reflection symmetry on one orthogonal axis.
  4. reflection symmetry on two orthogonal axes.
  5. reflection symmetry on one diagonal axis.
  6. reflection symmetry on two diagonal axes.
  7. dihedral symmetry.

In addition, groups of clues can display other types of symmetry, such as translational symmetry. Also refer to automorphic for a type of symmetry where the digits (not just their positions) play a role in another type of symmetry.

- Square – Another word for a cell of a sudoku. In technical use the term is avoided because of ambiguity with boxes.
- Transformation – A manipulation of a sudoku (or its grid) where it is changed or transformed into an essentially equivalent sudoku. One example of a transformation is a permutation of the digits (such as changing all digits from "123456789" to "234567891"). There are five other sudoku preserving transformations: row permutations within a band, column permutations within a stack, band permutations, stack permutations, and "reflection, transposition or rotation" (the later includes three transformations within a single class). A transformation can also be called a sudoku preserving symmetry. See Mathematics of Sudoku § Transformations for more details.

== Sudoku variants ==
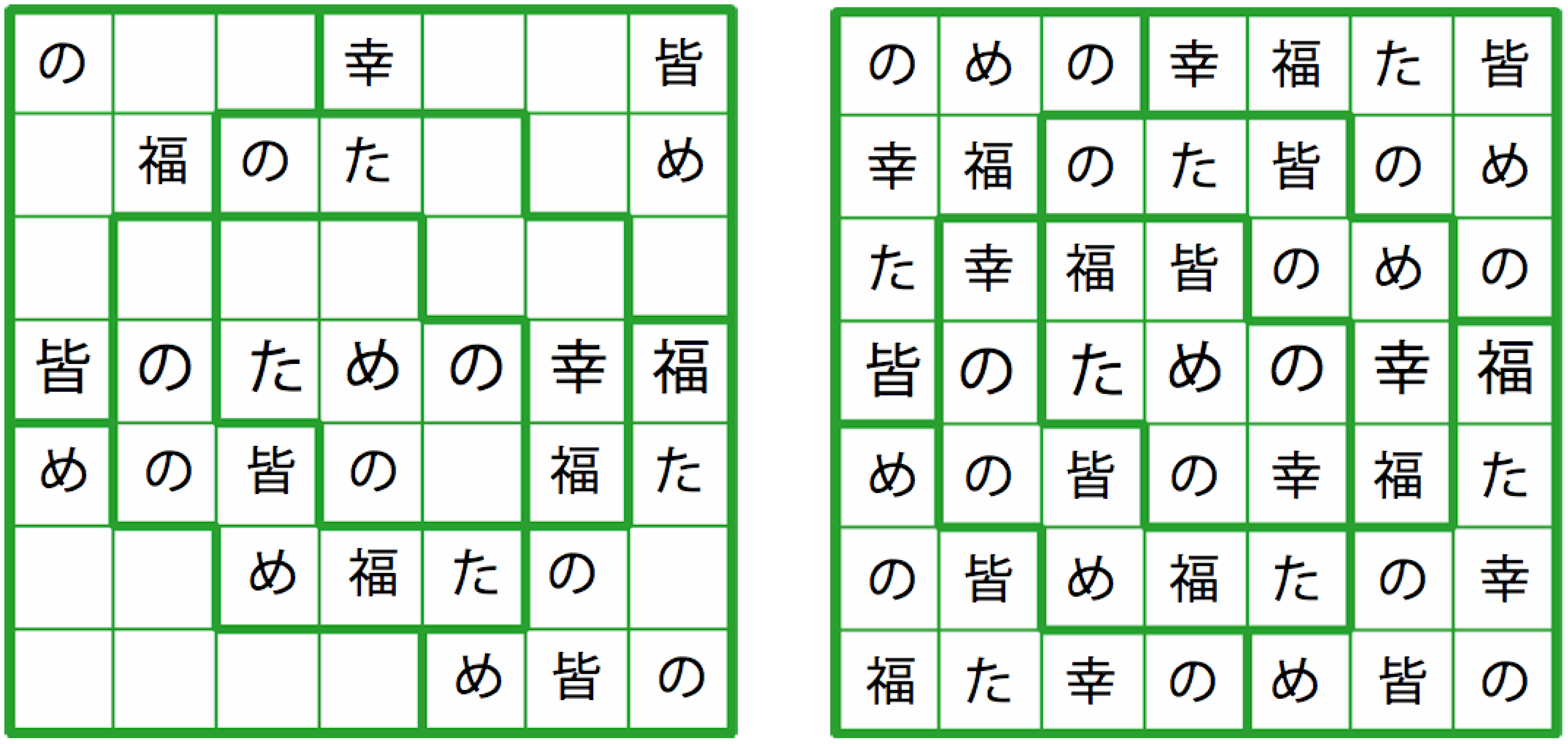
A sudoku variant with prime N (7×7) and solution. (with Japanese symbols).

Overlapping grids

The classic 9×9 sudoku format can be generalized to an

N×N row-column grid partitioned into N regions, where each of the N rows, columns and regions have N cells and each of the N digits occur once in each row, column or region.

This accommodates variants by region size and shape, e.g. 6-cell rectangular regions. (N×N sudoku is square). For prime N, polyomino-shaped regions can be used and the requirement to use equal-sized regions, or have the regions entirely cover the grid can be relaxed.

Other variations include additional value placement constraints, alternate symbols (e.g. letters), alternate mechanism for expressing the clues, and compositions with overlapping grids. See Sudoku § Variants for details and additional variants.

=== Sudoku types and classes ===
- Sub Doku – Grids smaller than 9×9. Sometimes referred to as "Children's Sudoku" (especially the 4×4 variant) as the reduced number of possibilities makes them easier to solve.
- Super Doku – Grids larger than 9×9.
- Prime Doku – N×N grid where N is prime. Generally constructed with polyomino regions, e.g. Go Doku and pentominos.
- Maximum Su Doku – The class of puzzles which have the maximum number of independent clues needed to allow a complete and unique solution.
- Minimum Su Doku – The class of puzzles which have the minimum number of clues needed to allow a complete and unique solution, i.e. minimal sudokus.
- Jigsaw sudoku – Regular 9×9 sudoku that row and column rules apply, but instead of a 3×3 grid they are nine Jigsaw shapes.

=== Variants by size ===
- Polyomino – A shape composed of equal sized, side-adjacent squares. Often used for sudoku region variants. Polyominos are named by size: (5) pentomino, (6) hexomino, (7) heptomino, (8) octomino, and (9) nonomino.

Sudoku X

- Du-sum-oh – 5×5, 6×6, 7×7, 8×8 or 9×9 grid with irregular, polyomino, shaped regions and minimal number of clues. Du-Sum-Oh puzzles are also known as Latin Squares Puzzles (invented by Mark Thompson), squiggly sudoku, jigsaw sudoku, irregular sudoku, or geometric sudoku. These puzzles typically have anywhere from 5 to 9 rows. The number of rows is always equal to the number of columns. The regions are polyominos made of the same number of squares that are in any one row of the puzzle. The irregularity of the regions compensates for the relatively small number of givens.
- 4×4 – Shi Doku. Four 2×2 regions. Shi is Japanese for 4.
- 5×5 – Go Doku and Logi-5. A 5×5 grid with pentomino regions. Go is Japanese for 5.
- 6×6 – Roku Doku A version of this was featured at the World Puzzle Championship. Six 2×3 rectangular regions.
- 7×7 – (Unnamed). A 7×7 grid with six heptomino regions and a disjoint region, featured at the World Puzzle Championship.
- 8×8 – Super Sudoku X. Four 4×2 + four 2×4 rectangular blocks.
- 9×9 –

Sudoku: Classic 9×9 grid.

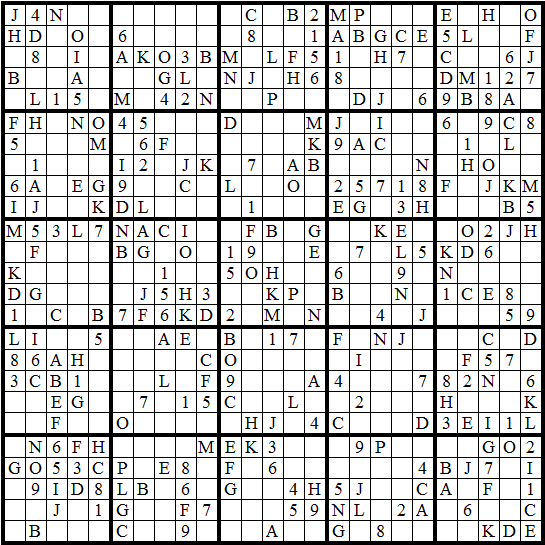
25×25 sudoku the Giant...

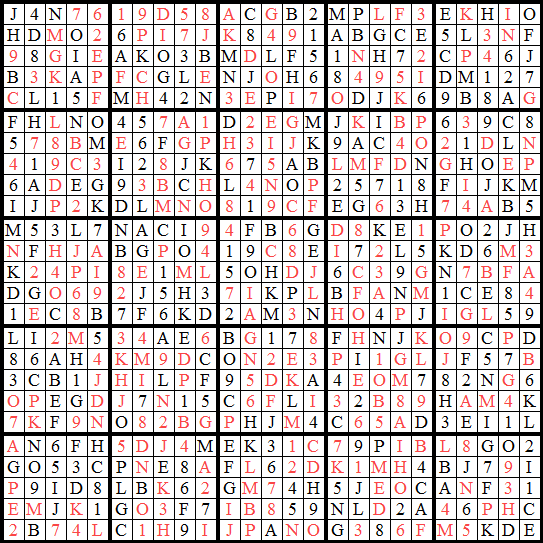
...and the solution

Sudoku X: Adds diagonals with uniqueness requirement.
Jigsaw sudoku: 9×9 grid with nonomino regions.

- 12×12 – Maxi. Twelve 3×4 rectangular blocks.
- 16×16 – Number Place Challenger. Sixteen 4×4 regions.
- 25×25 – Sudoku the Giant: Twenty-five 5×5 regions.
- 100×100 – Sudoku-zilla. 100 10×10 regions.

=== Variants with additional or different constraints ===
Sudokus variants can also have additional constraints on the placement of digits, such as "< >" relations, sums, linked cells, etc.

- Hypersudoku – Additional 3×3 boxes are added within the main grid.
- Main diagonals unique – The cell values along both main diagonals must be unique, such as Sudoku X.
- Relative digit location – Digits use the same relative location within selected regions. The matching cells or regions are often color-coded.
- Killer sudoku (clue sums) – Regions of various shapes and sizes. The usual constraints of no repeated value in any row, column or region apply. The clues are given as sums of values within regions (e.g. a 4-cell region with sum 10 must consist of values 1,2,3,4 in some order).
- Sandwich sudoku - numbers outside the grid specify the sum of the digits in a row or column which are sandwiched between the '1' and the '9'.

== Terms related to solving ==
The meanings of most of these terms can be extended to region shapes other than boxes (square-shaped). To simplify reading, definitions are given only in terms of boxes.

- Scanning – The process of working through a puzzle to look for or eliminate values.
- Cross hatching – Process of elimination that checks rows and columns intersecting a block for a given value to limit the possible locations in the block.
- Counting – Process of stepping through the values for a row, column or block to see where they can or cannot be used.
- Box line reduction strategy – A form of intersection removal in which candidates which must belong to a line can be ruled out as candidates in a block (or box) that intersects the line in question.
- Candidate – Potential value for a cell.
- Contingency – A condition limiting the location of a value.
- Chain – A sequence of contingencies connected by alternative values.
- Higher circuits – Related locations outside the immediate row, column and grid. The locations are related by value contingencies.
- Independent clues – A set of clues that cannot be deduced from each other. Often depends on the order of choosing the clues for a given grid.
- Intersection removal – When any one number occurs twice or three times in just one unit (or scope) then that number can be removed from the intersection of another unit. For example, if a certain number must occur on a certain line, then occurrences of that number found in a block that intersects this line can be ruled out as candidates. Sometimes called pointing (or matched) pairs (or twins)/triples (triplets) as they point out a candidate that can be removed.
- Nishio – What-if method of elimination, where the use of a candidate that would make its other (necessary) placements impossible is eliminated.
- Single (or singleton, or lone number) – The only candidate in a cell.
- Hidden single – A candidate that appears with others, but only once in a given row, column or box.
- Locked candidate – A candidate limited to a row or column within a block.
- Naked pair – Two cells in a row, column or block, which together contain only the same two candidates. These candidates can be excluded from other cells in the same row, column or block.
- Hidden pair – Two candidates that appear only in two cells in a row, column or block. Other candidates in those two cells can be eliminated.
- Trio – Three cells in a unit sharing three numbers exclusively. See "Triples and quads".
- Triples and quads – The concepts applied to pairs can also be applied to triples and quads.
- X-wing – See N-fish (with N=2).
- Swordfish – See N-fish (with N=3).
- N-fish – Analogues of hidden pairs/triples/quads for multiple rows and columns. A pattern formed by all candidate cells for some digit in N rows (or columns), that spans only N columns (rows). All other candidates for that digit in those columns (rows) can then be excluded. Names for various N-fish:
  - 2-fish: X-wing
  - 3-fish: Swordfish
  - 4-fish: Jellyfish
  - 5-fish: Squirmbag – For 9×9 sudoku, since every N-fish comes paired with a 9-N fish whose effect is the same (thus any 5-fish is paired with a jellyfish; any 6-fish with a swordfish; any 7-fish with an x-wing; any 8-fish with a hidden or naked single). Nevertheless, a 5-fish is occasionally called a squirmbag.
  - 6+ fish: 6-gronk, 7-gronk – these patterns are only useful for sudoku larger than 9×9.
- Remote pairs: When a long string of naked pairs that leads around the grid exists, any cells that are in the intersection of the cells at the beginning and the end of the string may not be either of the numbers in the naked pairs, for example, 4 and 7.

== See also ==
- KenKen
- Sudoku
- Mathematics of Sudoku
- Sudoku solving algorithms
