= DLX (disambiguation) =

DLX may refer to:

- DLX, a RISC processor architecture
- Dancing Links, a computer algorithm
- Warehouse Management System of JDA Software
- Dlx (gene)
- David Letterman Bypass, the proposed name of Interstate 465 in Indianapolis
- 560 in Roman numerals
