= Survo puzzle =

Logic puzzle

A Survo puzzle is a kind of logic puzzle presented (in April 2006) and studied by Seppo Mustonen. The name of the puzzle is associated with Mustonen's Survo system, which is a general environment for statistical computing and related areas.

In a Survo puzzle, the task is to fill an m × n table with integers 1, 2, ..., m·n so that each of these numbers appears only once and their row and column sums are equal to integers given on the bottom and the right side of the table. Often some of the integers are given readily in the table to guarantee uniqueness of the solution and/or for making the task easier.

To some extent, Survo puzzles resemble Sudoku and Kakuro puzzles. However, numbers used in the solution are not restricted to 1, 2, ..., 9 and the size of puzzle grid is typically very small. Solving Survo puzzles is also related to making of magic squares.

The degree of difficulty in solving Survo puzzles is strongly varying. Easy puzzles, meant for school children, are pure exercises in addition and subtraction, while more demanding ones require also good logic reasoning. The hardest Survo puzzles cannot be solved without computers.

Certain properties of the Survo system like editorial computing and the COMB operation, making e.g. restricted integer partitions, support solving of Survo puzzles.

Survo puzzles have been published regularly in Finland by Ilta-Sanomat and the scientific magazine of the University of Helsinki from September 2006. Solving of Survo puzzles was one of the three main topics in the national entrance examination of the Finnish universities in computer science (2009).

== Example ==
Here is a simple Survo puzzle with 3 rows and 4 columns:

	A	B	C	D	
1		6			30
2	8				18
3			3		30
	27	16	10	25	

Numbers 3, 6, and 8 are readily given. The task is to put remaining numbers of 1-12 (3×4=12) to their places so that the sums are correct.

The puzzle has a unique solution found stepwise as follows: The missing numbers are 1,2,4,5,7,9,10,11,12. Usually it is best to start from a row or a column with fewest missing numbers. In this case columns A, B, and C are such.

Column A is not favorable since the sum 19 of missing numbers can be presented according to the rules in several ways (e.g. 19 = 7 + 12 = 12 + 7 = 9 + 10 = 10 + 9). In the column B the sum of missing numbers is 10 having only one partition 10 = 1 + 9 since the other alternatives 10 = 2 + 8 = 3 + 7 = 4 + 6 are not accepted due to numbers already present in the table. Number 9 cannot be put in the row 2 since then the sum of this row would exceed the value 18. Therefore, the only choice is to start the solution by

	A	B	C	D	
1		6			30
2	8	1			18
3		9	3		30
	27	16	10	25	

Now the column A has only one alternative 27 - 8 = 19 = 7 + 12 = 12 + 7. Number 7 cannot be in the row 1 because the sum of missing numbers in that row would be 30 - 7 - 6 = 17 and this allows no permitted partition. Thus we have

	A	B	C	D	
1	12	6			30
2	8	1			18
3	7	9	3		30
	27	16	10	25	

implying that the last number in the last row will be 30 - 7 - 9 -3 = 11:

	A	B	C	D	
1	12	6			30
2	8	1			18
3	7	9	3	11	30
	27	16	10	25	

In the first row the sum of the missing numbers is 30 - 12 - 6 = 12. Its only possible partition is 12 = 2 + 10 and so that number 2 will be in the column C; 10 in this position is too much for the column sum.

	A	B	C	D	
1	12	6	2	10	30
2	8	1			18
3	7	9	3	11	30
	27	16	10	25	

The solution is then easily completed as

	A	B	C	D	
1	12	6	2	10	30
2	8	1	5	4	18
3	7	9	3	11	30
	27	16	10	25	

Thus basic arithmetics and simple reasoning is enough for solving easy Survo puzzles like this one.

== Properties of Survo puzzles ==
The rules of Survo puzzles are simpler than those of Sudoku. The grid is always rectangular or square and typically much smaller than in Sudoku and Kakuro.

The solving strategies are varying depending on the difficulty of the puzzle. In their simplest form, as in the following 2 × 3 case (degree of difficulty 0)

		3	9
	6		12
9	7	5	

Survo puzzles are suitable exercises in addition and subtraction.

The open 3 × 4 Survo puzzle (degree of difficulty 150)

				24
				15
				39
21	10	18	29	

where none of the numbers are readily given, is much harder. Also it has only one solution.

The problem can be simplified by giving some of the numbers readily, for example, as

7		5		24
	1		8	15
		11		39
21	10	18	29	

which makes the task almost trivial (degree of difficulty 0).

== Assessing degree of difficulty ==
Measuring the degree of difficulty is based on the number of 'mutations' needed by the first solver program made by Mustonen in April 2006. This program works by using a partially randomized algorithm.

The program starts by inserting the missing numbers randomly in the table and tries then to get the computed sums of rows and columns as close to the true ones as possible by exchanging elements in the table systematically. This trial leads either to a correct solution or (as in most cases) to dead end where the discrepancy between computed and true sums cannot be diminished systematically. In the latter case a 'mutation' is made by exchanging two or more numbers randomly. Thereafter the systematic procedure plus mutation is repeated until a true solution is found. In most cases, the mean number of mutations works as a crude measure for the level of difficulty of solving a Survo puzzle. This measure (MD) is computed as the mean number of mutations when the puzzle is solved 1000 times by starting from a randomized table. The distribution of the number of mutations comes close to a geometric distribution.

These numeric values are often converted to a 5-star scale as follows:

MD

0 - 30	*
31 - 150	**
151 - 600	***
601 - 1500	****
1500 -	*****

The degree of difficulty given as an MD value is rather inaccurate and it may be even misleading when the solution is found by clever deductions or by creative guesswork. This measure works better when it is required that the solver also proves that the solution is unique.

== Open Survo puzzles ==
A Survo puzzle is called open, if merely marginal sums are given. Two open m × n puzzles are considered essentially different if one of them cannot converted to another by interchanging rows and columns or by transposing when m = n. In these puzzles the row and column sums are distinct. The number of essentially different and uniquely solvable m × n Survo puzzles is denoted by S(m,n).

Reijo Sund was the first to pay attention to enumeration of open Survo puzzles. He calculated S(3,3)=38 by studying all 9! = 362880 possible 3 × 3 tables by the standard combinatorial and data handling program modules of Survo. Thereafter Mustonen found S(3,4)=583 by starting from all possible partitions of marginal sums and by using the first solver program. Petteri Kaski computed S(4,4)=5327 by converting the task into an exact cover problem.

Mustonen made in Summer 2007 a new solver program which confirms the previous results. The following S(m,n) values have been determined by this new program:

n m	2	3	4	5	6	7	8	9	10
2	1	18	62	278	1146	5706	28707	154587	843476
3	18	38	583	5337	55815	617658			
4	62	583	5327	257773					
5	278	5337	257773						
6	1146	55815							
7	5706	617658							
8	28707								
9	154587								
10	843476								

Already computation of S(5,5) seems to be a very hard task on the basis of present knowledge.

== Swapping method ==
The swapping method for solution of Survo puzzles has been created by combining the idea of the original solver program to the observation that the products of the marginal sums crudely indicate the positions of the correct numbers in the final solution. The procedure is started by filling the original table by numbers 1,2,...,m·n according to sizes of these products and by computing row and column sums according to this initial setup. Depending on how these sums deviate from the true sums, it is tried to improve the solution by swapping two numbers at a time. When using the swapping method the nature of solving Survo puzzles becomes somewhat similar to that of Chess problems. By this method it is hardly possible to verify the uniqueness of the solution.

For example, a rather demanding 4 × 4 puzzle (MD=2050)

				51
				36
				32
				17
51	42	26	17	

is solved by 5 swaps. The initial setup is

					Sum	OK	error
	16	15	10	8	49	51	-2
	14	12	9	4	39	36	3
	13	11	6	3	33	32	1
	7	5	2	1	15	17	-2
Sum	50	43	27	16			
OK	51	42	26	17			
error	-1	1	1	-1			

and the solution is found by swaps (7,9) (10,12) (10,11) (15,16) (1,2). In the Survo system, a sucro /SP_SWAP takes care of bookkeeping needed in the swapping method.

== Quick games ==
Solving of a hard Survo puzzle can take several hours. Solving Survo puzzles as quick games offers another kind of challenges. The most demanding form of a quick game is available in the net as a Java applet. In this quick game, open 5 × 5 puzzles are solved by selecting (or guessing) the numbers by mouse clicks. A wrong choice evokes a melodic musical interval. Its range and direction indicate the quality and the amount of the error. The target is to attain as high score as possible. The score grows by correct choices and it is decreased by wrong ones and by the time used for finding the final solution.

A 4x4 version of is available for iOS devices as "Hot Box".

== See also ==
- Sudoku
- Kakuro
- Magic square
