= Max Bezzel =

German chess player

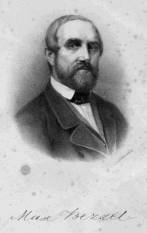
Max Bezzel

Max Friedrich William Bezzel (4 February 1824 – 30 July 1871) was a German chess composer who created the eight queens puzzle in 1848.
