= Eight queens puzzle =

Mathematical problem set on a chessboard

Position: f8 white queen, d7 white queen, g6 white queen, a5 white queen, h4 white queen, b3 white queen, e2 white queen, c1 white queen

The only symmetrical solution to the eight queens puzzle (up to rotation and reflection)

The eight queens puzzle is the problem of placing eight chess queens on an 8×8 chessboard so that no two queens threaten each other; thus, a solution requires that no two queens share the same row, column, or diagonal. There are 92 solutions. The problem was first posed in the mid-19th century. In the modern era, it is often used as an example problem for various computer programming techniques.

The eight queens puzzle is a special case of the more general n queens problem of placing n non-attacking queens on an n×n chessboard. Solutions exist for all natural numbers n with the exception of n = 2 and n = 3. Although the exact number of solutions is only known for n ≤ 27, the asymptotic growth rate of the number of solutions is approximately $(0.143n)^n$.

== History ==
Chess composer Max Bezzel published the eight queens puzzle in 1848. Franz Nauck published the first solutions in 1850. Nauck also extended the puzzle to the n queens problem, with n queens on a chessboard of n×n squares.

Since then, many mathematicians, including Carl Friedrich Gauss, have worked on both the eight queens puzzle and its generalized n-queens version. In 1874, S. Günther proposed a method using determinants to find solutions. J.W.L. Glaisher refined Gunther's approach.

In 1972, Edsger Dijkstra used this problem to illustrate the power of what he called structured programming. He published a highly detailed description of a depth-first backtracking algorithm.

== Constructing and counting solutions when n = 8 ==
The problem of finding all solutions to the 8-queens problem can be quite computationally expensive, as there are 4,426,165,368 possible arrangements of eight queens on an 8×8 board, (Note: The number of combinations of 8 squares from 64 is the binomial coefficient _{64}C_{8}.) but only 92 solutions. It is possible to use shortcuts that reduce computational requirements or rules of thumb that avoids brute-force computational techniques. For example, by applying a simple rule that chooses one queen from each column, it is possible to reduce the number of possibilities to 16,777,216 (that is, 8^{8}) possible combinations. Generating permutations further reduces the possibilities to just 40,320 (that is, 8!), which can then be checked for diagonal attacks.

The eight queens puzzle has 92 distinct solutions. If solutions that differ only by the symmetry operations of rotation and reflection of the board are counted as one, the puzzle has 12 solutions. These are called fundamental solutions; representatives of each are shown below.

A fundamental solution usually has eight variants (including its original form) obtained by rotating 90, 180, or 270° and then reflecting each of the four rotational variants in a mirror in a fixed position. However, one of the 12 fundamental solutions (solution 12 below) is identical to its own 180° rotation, so has only four variants (itself and its reflection, its 90° rotation and the reflection of that). (Note: Other symmetries are possible for other values of n. For example, there is a placement of five nonattacking queens on a 5×5 board that is identical to its own 90° rotation. Such solutions have only two variants (itself and its reflection). If n > 1, it is not possible for a solution to be equal to its own reflection because that would require two queens to be facing each other.) Thus, the total number of distinct solutions is 11×8 + 1×4 = 92.

All fundamental solutions are presented below:

Position: d8 white queen, g7 white queen, c6 white queen, h5 white queen, b4 white queen, e3 white queen, a2 white queen, f1 white queen

Solution 1

Position: e8 white queen, b7 white queen, d6 white queen, g5 white queen, c4 white queen, h3 white queen, f2 white queen, a1 white queen

Solution 2

Position: d8 white queen, b7 white queen, g6 white queen, c5 white queen, f4 white queen, h3 white queen, e2 white queen, a1 white queen

Solution 3

Position: d8 white queen, f7 white queen, h6 white queen, c5 white queen, a4 white queen, g3 white queen, e2 white queen, b1 white queen

Solution 4

Position: c8 white queen, f7 white queen, h6 white queen, a5 white queen, d4 white queen, g3 white queen, e2 white queen, b1 white queen

Solution 5

Position: e8 white queen, c7 white queen, h6 white queen, d5 white queen, g4 white queen, a3 white queen, f2 white queen, b1 white queen

Solution 6

Position: e8 white queen, g7 white queen, d6 white queen, a5 white queen, c4 white queen, h3 white queen, f2 white queen, b1 white queen

Solution 7

Position: d8 white queen, a7 white queen, e6 white queen, h5 white queen, f4 white queen, c3 white queen, g2 white queen, b1 white queen

Solution 8

Position: c8 white queen, f7 white queen, d6 white queen, a5 white queen, h4 white queen, e3 white queen, g2 white queen, b1 white queen

Solution 9

Position: f8 white queen, b7 white queen, g6 white queen, a5 white queen, d4 white queen, h3 white queen, e2 white queen, c1 white queen

Solution 10

Position: d8 white queen, g7 white queen, a6 white queen, h5 white queen, e4 white queen, b3 white queen, f2 white queen, c1 white queen

Solution 11

Position: f8 white queen, d7 white queen, g6 white queen, a5 white queen, h4 white queen, b3 white queen, e2 white queen, c1 white queen

Solution 12

Solution 10 has the additional property that no three queens are in a straight line.

== Existence of solutions ==
Brute-force algorithms to count the number of solutions are computationally manageable for $n = 8$, but would be intractable for problems of $n \geq 20$, as 20! = 2.433 × 10^{18}. If the goal is to find a single solution, one can show solutions exist for all n ≥ 4 with no search whatsoever. These solutions exhibit stair-stepped patterns, as in the following examples for n = 8, 9 and 10:

Position: d8 white queen, g7 white queen, c6 white queen, h5 white queen, b4 white queen, e3 white queen, a2 white queen, f1 white queen

Staircase solution for 8 queens

	a	b	c	d	e	f	g	h	i
9	a9	b9	c9	d9	e9	f9	g9 white queen	h9	i9	9
8	a8	b8	c8 white queen	d8	e8	f8	g8	h8	i8	8
7	a7	b7	c7	d7	e7	f7 white queen	g7	h7	i7	7
6	a6	b6 white queen	c6	d6	e6	f6	g6	h6	i6	6
5	a5	b5	c5	d5	e5 white queen	f5	g5	h5	i5	5
4	a4 white queen	b4	c4	d4	e4	f4	g4	h4	i4	4
3	a3	b3	c3	d3	e3	f3	g3	h3	i3 white queen	3
2	a2	b2	c2	d2 white queen	e2	f2	g2	h2	i2	2
1	a1	b1	c1	d1	e1	f1	g1	h1 white queen	i1	1
	a	b	c	d	e	f	g	h	i

Staircase solution for 9 queens

	a	b	c	d	e	f	g	h	i	j
10	a10	b10	c10	d10	e10 white queen	f10	g10	h10	i10	j10	10
9	a9	b9	c9	d9	e9	f9	g9	h9	i9	j9 white queen	9
8	a8	b8	c8	d8 white queen	e8	f8	g8	h8	i8	j8	8
7	a7	b7	c7	d7	e7	f7	g7	h7	i7 white queen	j7	7
6	a6	b6	c6 white queen	d6	e6	f6	g6	h6	i6	j6	6
5	a5	b5	c5	d5	e5	f5	g5	h5 white queen	i5	j5	5
4	a4	b4 white queen	c4	d4	e4	f4	g4	h4	i4	j4	4
3	a3	b3	c3	d3	e3	f3	g3 white queen	h3	i3	j3	3
2	a2 white queen	b2	c2	d2	e2	f2	g2	h2	i2	j2	2
1	a1	b1	c1	d1	e1	f1 white queen	g1	h1	i1	j1	1
	a	b	c	d	e	f	g	h	i	j

Staircase solution for 10 queens

The examples above can be obtained with the following formulas. Let (i, j) be the square in column i and row j on the n × n chessboard, k an integer.

One approach is

1. If the remainder from dividing n by 6 is not 2 or 3 then the list is simply all even numbers followed by all odd numbers not greater than n.
2. Otherwise, write separate lists of even and odd numbers (2, 4, 6, 8 – 1, 3, 5, 7).
3. If the remainder is 2, swap 1 and 3 in odd list and move 5 to the end (3, 1, 7, 5).
4. If the remainder is 3, move 2 to the end of even list and 1,3 to the end of odd list (4, 6, 8, 2 – 5, 7, 9, 1, 3).
5. Append odd list to the even list and place queens in the rows given by these numbers, from left to right (a2, b4, c6, d8, e3, f1, g7, h5).

For n = 8 this results in fundamental solution 1 above. A few more examples follow.

- 14 queens (remainder 2): 2, 4, 6, 8, 10, 12, 14, 3, 1, 7, 9, 11, 13, 5.
- 15 queens (remainder 3): 4, 6, 8, 10, 12, 14, 2, 5, 7, 9, 11, 13, 15, 1, 3.
- 20 queens (remainder 2): 2, 4, 6, 8, 10, 12, 14, 16, 18, 20, 3, 1, 7, 9, 11, 13, 15, 17, 19, 5.

== Counting solutions for other sizes n ==
=== Exact enumeration ===
There is no known formula for the exact number of solutions for placing n queens on an n × n board i.e. the number of independent sets of size n in an n × n queen's graph. The 27×27 board is the highest-order board that has been completely enumerated. The following tables give the number of solutions to the n queens problem, both fundamental (sequence A002562 in the OEIS) and all (sequence A000170 in the OEIS), for all known cases.

n	fundamental	all
1	1	1
2	0	0
3	0	0
4	1	2
5	2	10
6	1	4
7	6	40
8	12	92
9	46	352
10	92	724
11	341	2,680
12	1,787	14,200
13	9,233	73,712
14	45,752	365,596
15	285,053	2,279,184
16	1,846,955	14,772,512
17	11,977,939	95,815,104
18	83,263,591	666,090,624
19	621,012,754	4,968,057,848
20	4,878,666,808	39,029,188,884
21	39,333,324,973	314,666,222,712
22	336,376,244,042	2,691,008,701,644
23	3,029,242,658,210	24,233,937,684,440
24	28,439,272,956,934	227,514,171,973,736
25	275,986,683,743,434	2,207,893,435,808,352
26	2,789,712,466,510,289	22,317,699,616,364,044
27	29,363,495,934,315,694	234,907,967,154,122,528

The number of placements in which furthermore no three queens lie on any straight line is known for $n \leq 25$ (sequence A365437 in the OEIS).

=== Asymptotic enumeration ===
In 2021, Michael Simkin proved that for large numbers n, the number of solutions of the n queens problem is approximately $(0.143n)^n$. More precisely, the number $\mathcal{Q}(n)$ of solutions has asymptotic growth
$$\mathcal{Q}(n) = ((1 \pm o(1))ne^{-\alpha})^n$$
where $\alpha$ is a constant that lies between 1.939 and 1.945. (Here o(1) represents little o notation.)

If one instead considers a toroidal chessboard (where diagonals "wrap around" from the top edge to the bottom and from the left edge to the right), it is only possible to place n queens on an $n \times n$ board if $n \equiv 1,5 \mod 6.$ In this case, the asymptotic number of solutions is
$$T(n) = ((1+o(1))ne^{-3})^n.$$

== Related problems ==
50 queens that do not threaten one another on an 8×8×8 board

Higher dimensions
Find the number of non-attacking queens that can be placed in a d-dimensional chess space of size n. More than n queens can be placed in some higher dimensions (the smallest example is four non-attacking queens in a 3×3×3 chess space), and it is in fact known that for any k, there are higher dimensions where n^{k} queens do not suffice to attack all spaces.
Using pieces other than queens
On an 8×8 board one can place 32 knights, or 14 bishops, 16 kings or 8 rooks, so that no two pieces attack each other. In the case of knights, an easy solution is to place one on each square of a given color, since they move only to the opposite color. The solution is also easy for rooks and kings. Sixteen kings can be placed on the board by dividing it into 2-by-2 squares and placing the kings at equivalent points on each square. Placements of n rooks on an n×n board are in direct correspondence with order-n permutation matrices.
Chess variations
Related problems can be asked for chess variations such as shogi. For instance, the n+k dragon kings problem asks to place k shogi pawns and n+k mutually nonattacking dragon kings on an n×n shogi board.
Nonstandard boards
Pólya studied the n queens problem on a toroidal ("donut-shaped") board and showed that there is a solution on an n×n board if and only if n is not divisible by 2 or 3.
Domination
Given an n×n board, the domination number is the minimum number of queens (or other pieces) needed to attack or occupy every square. For n = 8 the queen's domination number is 5.
Queens and other pieces
Variants include mixing queens with other pieces; for example, placing m queens and m knights on an n×n board so that no piece attacks another or placing queens and pawns so that no two queens attack each other.
Magic squares
In 1992, Demirörs, Rafraf, and Tanik published a method for converting some magic squares into n-queens solutions, and vice versa.
Latin squares
In an n×n matrix, place each digit 1 through n in n locations in the matrix so that no two instances of the same digit are in the same row or column.
Exact cover
Consider a matrix with one primary column for each of the n ranks of the board, one primary column for each of the n files, and one secondary column for each of the 4n − 6 nontrivial diagonals of the board. The matrix has n^{2} rows: one for each possible queen placement, and each row has a 1 in the columns corresponding to that square's rank, file, and diagonals and a 0 in all the other columns. Then the n queens problem is equivalent to choosing a subset of the rows of this matrix such that every primary column has a 1 in precisely one of the chosen rows and every secondary column has a 1 in at most one of the chosen rows; this is an example of a generalized exact cover problem, of which sudoku is another example.
n-queens completion
The completion problem asks whether, given an n×n chessboard on which some queens are already placed, it is possible to place a queen in every remaining row so that no two queens attack each other. This and related questions are NP-complete and #P-complete. Any placement of at most n/60 queens can be completed, while there are partial configurations of roughly n/4 queens that cannot be completed.
Costas arrays
A non-attacking queens Costas array or NAQCA is a Costas array which is also a solution to the n queens problem. The only known NAQCA is the trivial 1×1 case, and it is conjectured that no others exist.

== Exercise in algorithm design ==
This animation illustrates backtracking to solve the problem. The ith queen is placed in the ith row of the chessboard, in a column that is known not to cause conflict. If a column is not found the program returns to the last good state and then tries a different column.

Finding all solutions to the eight queens puzzle is a good example of a simple but nontrivial problem. For this reason, it is often used as an example problem for various programming techniques, including nontraditional approaches such as constraint programming, logic programming or genetic algorithms. Most often, it is used as an example of a problem that can be solved with a recursive algorithm, by phrasing the n queens problem inductively in terms of adding a single queen to any solution to the problem of placing n−1 queens on an n×n chessboard. The induction bottoms out with the solution to the 'problem' of placing 0 queens on the chessboard, which is the empty chessboard. This process can be made more efficient by applying the observation that each column of the chessboard must contain exactly one queen, and restricting the positions at which the algorithm tries adding the ith queen to the ith row of the chessboard, in columns that are not already attacked by other queens. These choices significantly reduce the number of placements that need to be tried, allowing the algorithm to find all solutions on an $8\times 8$ chessboard in a time so short as to appear instantaneous.

min-conflicts solution to 8 queens

An alternative to exhaustive search is an 'iterative repair' algorithm, which typically starts with all queens on the board, for example with one queen per column. It then counts the number of conflicts (attacks), and uses a heuristic to determine how to improve the placement of the queens. The 'minimum-conflicts' heuristic – moving the piece with the largest number of conflicts to the square in the same column where the number of conflicts is smallest – is particularly effective: it easily finds a solution to even the 1,000,000 queens problem.

Unlike the backtracking search outlined above, iterative repair does not guarantee a solution: like all greedy procedures, it may get stuck on a local optimum. (In such a case, the algorithm may be restarted with a different initial configuration.) On the other hand, it can solve problem sizes that are several orders of magnitude beyond the scope of a depth-first search.

As an alternative to backtracking, solutions can be counted by recursively enumerating valid partial solutions, one row at a time. Rather than constructing entire board positions, blocked diagonals and columns are tracked with bitwise operations. This does not allow the recovery of individual solutions.

== Sample program ==
The following program is a translation of Niklaus Wirth's solution into the Python programming language, but does without the index arithmetic found in the original and instead uses lists to keep the program code as simple as possible. By using a coroutine in the form of a generator function, both versions of the original can be unified to compute either one or all of the solutions. Only 15,720 possible queen placements are examined.

def queens(n: int, i: int, a: list, b: list, c: list):
    if i < n:
        for j in range(n):
            if j not in a and i + j not in b and i - j not in c:
                yield from queens(n, i + 1, a + [j], b + [i + j], c + [i - j])
    else:
        yield a

for solution in queens(8, 0, [], [], []):
    print(solution)

The following program is an implementation of Donald Knuth's informal description of the solution on Page 31, Section 7.2.2 Backtrack Programming from The Art of Computer Programming, Volume 4B into the Python programming language.

def property(perm: list) -> bool:
    for k in range(0, len(perm)):
        for j in range(0, len(perm)):
            if j < k:
                if perm[k] == perm[j]:
                    return False
                elif abs(perm[k] - perm[j]) == k - j:
                    return False
    return True

def extend(perm: list, n: int):
    new_perm = []
    for p in perm:
        for i in range(0, n):
            new_perm.append(p + [i])
    return new_perm

def n_queens(n: int) -> int:
    domain = list(range(0, n))
    perm = [[]]
    for i in range(n):
        new_perm = list(filter(property, extend(perm, n)))
        perm = new_perm
    return len(perm)

== In popular culture ==
- In the game The 7th Guest, the 8th Puzzle: "The Queen's Dilemma" in the game room of the Stauf mansion is the de facto eight queens puzzle.
- In the game Professor Layton and the Curious Village, the 130th puzzle: "Too Many Queens 5" (クイーンの問題5) is an eight queens puzzle.

== See also ==
- Costas array
- Mathematical game
- Mathematical puzzle
- No-three-in-line problem
- Rook polynomial
