= Backtracking =

Algorithmic paradigm for constraint satisfaction or enumeration problems

Backtracking is a class of algorithms for finding solutions to some computational problems, notably constraint satisfaction or enumeration problems, that incrementally builds candidates to the solutions, and abandons a candidate ("backtracks") as soon as it determines that the candidate cannot possibly be completed to a valid solution.

The classic textbook example of the use of backtracking is the eight queens puzzle, that asks for all arrangements of eight chess queens on a standard chessboard so that no queen attacks any other. In the common backtracking approach, the partial candidates are arrangements of k queens in the first k rows of the board, all in different rows and columns. Any partial solution that contains two mutually attacking queens can be abandoned.

Backtracking can be applied only for problems which admit the concept of a "partial candidate solution" and a relatively quick test of whether it can possibly be completed to a valid solution. It is useless, for example, for locating a given value in an unordered table. When it is applicable, however, backtracking is often much faster than brute-force enumeration of all complete candidates, since it can eliminate many candidates with a single test.

Backtracking is an important tool for solving constraint satisfaction problems, such as crosswords, verbal arithmetic, Sudoku, and many other puzzles. It is often the most convenient technique for parsing, for the knapsack problem and other combinatorial optimization problems. It is also the program execution strategy used in the programming languages Icon, Planner and Prolog.

Backtracking depends on user-given "black box procedures" that define the problem to be solved, the nature of the partial candidates, and how they are extended into complete candidates. It is therefore a metaheuristic rather than a specific algorithm – although, unlike many other meta-heuristics, it is guaranteed to find all solutions to a finite problem in a bounded amount of time.

The term "backtrack" was coined by American mathematician D. H. Lehmer in the 1950s. The pioneer string-processing language SNOBOL (1962) may have been the first to provide a built-in general backtracking facility.

== Description of the method ==
The backtracking algorithm enumerates a set of partial candidates that, in principle, could be completed in various ways to give all the possible solutions to the given problem. The completion is done incrementally, by a sequence of candidate extension steps.

Conceptually, the partial candidates are represented as the nodes of a tree structure, the potential search tree. Each partial candidate is the parent of the candidates that differ from it by a single extension step; the leaves of the tree are the partial candidates that cannot be extended any further.

The backtracking algorithm traverses this search tree recursively, from the root down, in depth-first order. At each node c, the algorithm checks whether c can be completed to a valid solution. If it cannot, the whole sub-tree rooted at c is skipped (pruned). Otherwise, the algorithm (1) checks whether c itself is a valid solution, and if so reports it to the user; and (2) recursively enumerates all sub-trees of c. The two tests and the children of each node are defined by user-given procedures.

Therefore, the actual search tree that is traversed by the algorithm is only a part of the potential tree. The total cost of the algorithm is the number of nodes of the actual tree times the cost of obtaining and processing each node. This fact should be considered when choosing the potential search tree and implementing the pruning test.

=== Pseudocode ===
In order to apply backtracking to a specific class of problems, one must provide the data P for the particular instance of the problem that is to be solved, and six procedural parameters, root, reject, accept, first, next, and output. These procedures should take the instance data P as a parameter and should do the following:

1. root(P): return the partial candidate at the root of the search tree.
2. reject(P,c): return true only if the partial candidate c is not worth completing.
3. accept(P,c): return true if c is a solution of P, and false otherwise.
4. first(P,c): generate the first extension of candidate c.
5. next(P,s): generate the next alternative extension of a candidate, after the extension s.
6. output(P,c): use the solution c of P, as appropriate to the application.

The backtracking algorithm reduces the problem to the call backtrack(P, root(P)), where backtrack is the following recursive procedure:

procedure backtrack(P, c) is
    if reject(P, c) then return
    if accept(P, c) then output(P, c)
    s ← first(P, c)
    while s ≠ NULL do
        backtrack(P, s)
        s ← next(P, s)

=== Usage considerations ===
The reject procedure should be a Boolean-valued function that returns true only if it is certain that no possible extension of c is a valid solution for P. If the procedure cannot reach a definite conclusion, it should return false. An incorrect true result may cause the backtrack procedure to miss some valid solutions. The procedure may assume that reject(P,t) returned false for every ancestor t of c in the search tree.

On the other hand, the efficiency of the backtracking algorithm depends on reject returning true for candidates that are as close to the root as possible. If reject always returns false, the algorithm will still find all solutions, but it will be equivalent to a brute-force search.

The accept procedure should return true if c is a complete and valid solution for the problem instance P, and false otherwise. It may assume that the partial candidate c and all its ancestors in the tree have passed the reject test.

The general pseudo-code above does not assume that the valid solutions are always leaves of the potential search tree. In other words, it admits the possibility that a valid solution for P can be further extended to yield other valid solutions.

The first and next procedures are used by the backtracking algorithm to enumerate the children of a node c of the tree, that is, the candidates that differ from c by a single extension step. The call first(P,c) should yield the first child of c, in some order; and the call next(P,s) should return the next sibling of node s, in that order. Both functions should return a distinctive "NULL" candidate, if the requested child does not exist.

Together, the root, first, and next functions define the set of partial candidates and the potential search tree. They should be chosen so that every solution of P occurs somewhere in the tree, and no partial candidate occurs more than once. Moreover, they should admit an efficient and effective reject predicate.

=== Early stopping variants ===
The pseudo-code above will call output for all candidates that are a solution to the given instance P. The algorithm can be modified to stop after finding the first solution, or a specified number of solutions; or after testing a specified number of partial candidates, or after spending a given amount of CPU time.

== Examples ==
A Sudoku solved by backtracking

Examples where backtracking can be used to solve puzzles or problems include:

- Puzzles such as eight queens puzzle, crosswords, verbal arithmetic, Sudoku, (Note: See Sudoku solving algorithms.) and Peg Solitaire.
- Combinatorial optimization problems such as parsing and the knapsack problem.
- Goal-directed programming languages such as Icon, Planner and Prolog, which use backtracking internally to generate answers.
- The DPLL algorithm for solving the Boolean satisfiability problem.

The following is an example where backtracking is used for the constraint satisfaction problem:

=== Constraint satisfaction ===
The general constraint satisfaction problem consists in finding a list of integers x = (x[1], x[2], …, x[n]), each in some range {1, 2, …, m}, that satisfies some arbitrary constraint (Boolean function) F.

For this class of problems, the instance data P would be the integers m and n, and the predicate F. In a typical backtracking solution to this problem, one could define a partial candidate as a list of integers c = (c[1], c[2], …, c[k]), for any k between 0 and n, that are to be assigned to the first k variables x[1], x[2], …, x[k]. The root candidate would then be the empty list (). The first and next procedures would then be

function first(P, c) is
    k ← length(c)
    if k = n then
        return NULL
    else
        return (c[1], c[2], ..., c[k], 1)

function next(P, s) is
    k ← length(s)
    if s[k] = m then
        return NULL
    else
        return (s[1], s[2], ..., s[k − 1], 1 + s[k])

Here length(c) is the number of elements in the list c.

The call reject(P, c) should return true if the constraint F cannot be satisfied by any list of n integers that begins with the k elements of c. For backtracking to be effective, there must be a way to detect this situation, at least for some candidates c, without enumerating all those m^{n − k} n-tuples.

For example, if F is the conjunction of several Boolean predicates, F = F[1] ∧ F[2] ∧ … ∧ F[p], and each F[i] depends only on a small subset of the variables x[1], …, x[n], then the reject procedure could simply check the terms F[i] that depend only on variables x[1], …, x[k], and return true if any of those terms returns false. In fact, reject needs only check those terms that do depend on x[k], since the terms that depend only on x[1], …, x[k − 1] will have been tested further up in the search tree.

Assuming that reject is implemented as above, then accept(P, c) needs only check whether c is complete, that is, whether it has n elements.

It is generally better to order the list of variables so that it begins with the most critical ones (i.e. the ones with fewest value options, or which have a greater impact on subsequent choices).

One could also allow the next function to choose which variable should be assigned when extending a partial candidate, based on the values of the variables already assigned by it. Further improvements can be obtained by the technique of constraint propagation.

In addition to retaining minimal recovery values used in backing up, backtracking implementations commonly keep a variable trail, to record value change history. An efficient implementation will avoid creating a variable trail entry between two successive changes when there is no choice point, as the backtracking will erase all of the changes as a single operation.

An alternative to the variable trail is to keep a timestamp of when the last change was made to the variable. The timestamp is compared to the timestamp of a choice point. If the choice point has an associated time later than that of the variable, it is unnecessary to revert the variable when the choice point is backtracked, as it was changed before the choice point occurred.

== See also ==
- Ariadne's thread (logic) – Problem solving method
- Backjumping – In backtracking algorithms, technique that reduces search space
- Backward chaining – Method of forming inferences
- Enumeration algorithm – Algorithm that outputs all solutions to a problem
- Sudoku solving algorithms – Algorithms to complete a sudoku
