= Taking Sudoku Seriously =

2011 book about sudoku

- Author: Jason Rosenhouse; Laura Taalman
- Subject: Mathematics–Social aspects, Sudoku
- Publisher: Oxford University Press
- Publication date: 2011
- Pages: 214
- Awards: PROSE: Popular science & Popular mathematics
- ISBN: 978-0-19-991315-2
- OCLC: 774293834
- Dewey Decimal: 793.74
- LC Class: GV1507.S83

Taking Sudoku Seriously: The Math Behind the World's Most Popular Pencil Puzzle is a book on the mathematics of sudoku. It was written by Jason Rosenhouse and Laura Taalman, and published in 2011 by the Oxford University Press. The Basic Library List Committee of the Mathematical Association of America has suggested its inclusion in undergraduate mathematics libraries. It was the 2012 winner of the PROSE Awards in the popular science and popular mathematics category.

== Topics ==
The book is centered around sudoku puzzles, using them as a jumping-off point "to discuss a broad spectrum of topics in mathematics". In many cases these topics are presented through simplified examples which can be understood by hand calculation before extending them to sudoku itself using computers. The book also includes discussions on the nature of mathematics and the use of computers in mathematics.

After an introductory chapter on sudoku and its deductive puzzle-solving techniques (also touching on Euler tours and Hamiltonian cycles), the book has eight more chapters and an epilogue. Chapters two and three discuss Latin squares, the thirty-six officers problem, Leonhard Euler's incorrect conjecture on Graeco-Latin squares, and related topics. Here, a Latin square is a grid of numbers with the same property as a sudoku puzzle's solution of having each number appear once in each row and once in each column. They can be traced back to mathematics in medieval Islam, were studied recreationally by Benjamin Franklin, and have seen more serious application in the design of experiments and in error correction codes. sudoku puzzles also constrain square blocks of cells to contain each number once, making a restricted type of Latin square called a gerechte design.

Chapters four and five concern the combinatorial enumeration of completed sudoku puzzles, before and after factoring out the symmetries and equivalence classes of these puzzles using Burnside's lemma in group theory. Chapter six looks at combinatorial search techniques for finding small systems of givens that uniquely define a puzzle solution; soon after the book's publication, these methods were used to show that the minimum possible number of givens is 17.

The next two chapters look at two different mathematical formalizations of the problem of going from a sudoku problem to its solution, one involving graph coloring (more precisely, precoloring extension of the sudoku graph) and another involving using the Gröbner basis method to solve systems of polynomial equations. The final chapter studies questions in extremal combinatorics motivated by sudoku, and (although 76 sudoku puzzles of various types are scattered throughout the earlier chapters) the epilogue presents a collection of 20 additional puzzles, in advanced variations of sudoku.

== Audience and reception ==
This book is intended for a general audience interested in recreational mathematics, including mathematically inclined high school students. It is intended to counter the widespread misimpression that sudoku is not mathematical, and could help students appreciate the distinction between mathematical reasoning and rote calculation. In MAA Reviews (a publication of the Mathematical Association of America), reviewer Mark Hunacek called it called it "a delightful book which I thoroughly enjoyed reading" and said "a person with very limited background in mathematics, or a person without much experience solving sudoku puzzles, could still find something of interest here". It can also be used by professional mathematicians, for instance in setting research projects for students. It is unlikely to improve sudoku puzzle-solving skills, but Keith Devlin wrote in The Wall Street Journal that sudoku players can still gain "a deeper appreciation for the puzzle they love". However, reviewer Nicola Tilt said in Significance (a magazine of the Royal Statistical Society) that the book's target audience seemed unclear, writing that "the content may be deemed a little simplistic for mathematicians, and a little too diverse for real puzzle enthusiasts".

In The Mathematical Gazette, reviewer David Bevan called the book "beautifully produced", "well written", and "highly recommended". In the same publication, reviewer Donald Keedwell said "this well-written book would be of interest to anyone, mathematician or not, who likes solving sudoku puzzles," although he complained that the section on graph coloring is "abstract and demanding" and overly US-centric in its approach.
