= Taalman =

Taalman is a surname. In the late middle ages, a taalman was a type of legal functionary in what is now the Netherlands and Belgium.

Taalman is the surname of:

- Kyle Taalman, goalkeeper for American soccer club Grand Rapids FC
- Laura Taalman, American mathematician
