= Laura Taalman =

American mathematician

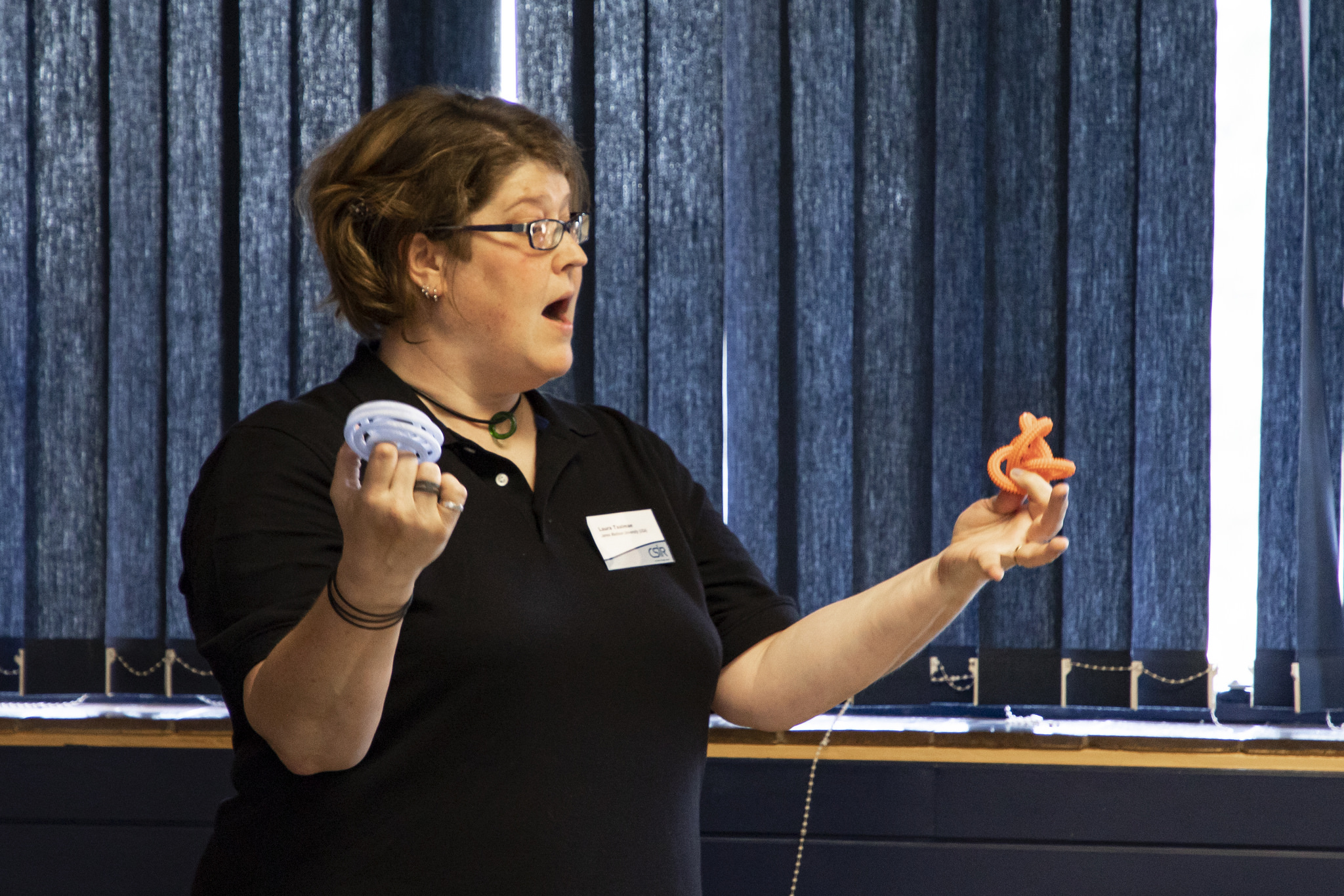
Laura Taalman in South Africa

Laura Anne Taalman, also known as mathgrrl, is an American mathematician known for her work on the mathematics of Sudoku and for her mathematical 3D printing models. Her mathematical research concerns knot theory and singular algebraic geometry; she is a professor of mathematics at James Madison University.

== Life ==
Taalman earned a bachelor's degree in mathematics from the University of Chicago in 1994. She completed her Ph.D. at Duke University in 2000; her dissertation, Monomial Generators for the Nash Sheaf of a Complete Resolution, was supervised by William L. Pardon. On finishing her doctorate, she joined the James Madison faculty; she has also worked as the mathematician-in-residence at the National Museum of Mathematics in 2014–2015.

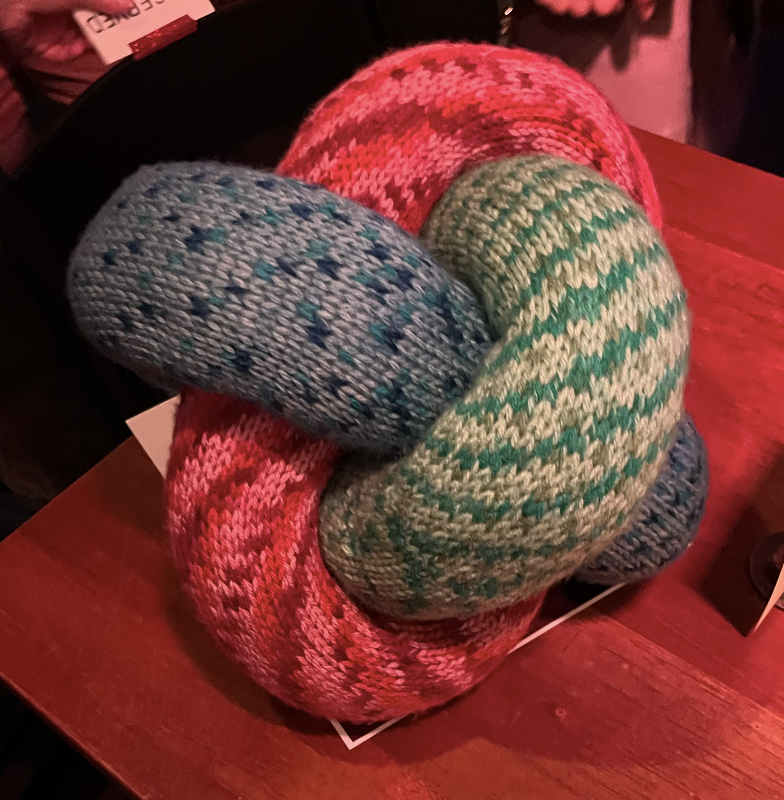
A knitted model of a Borromean ring that Laura Taalman displayed New York City.

== 3d printing ==
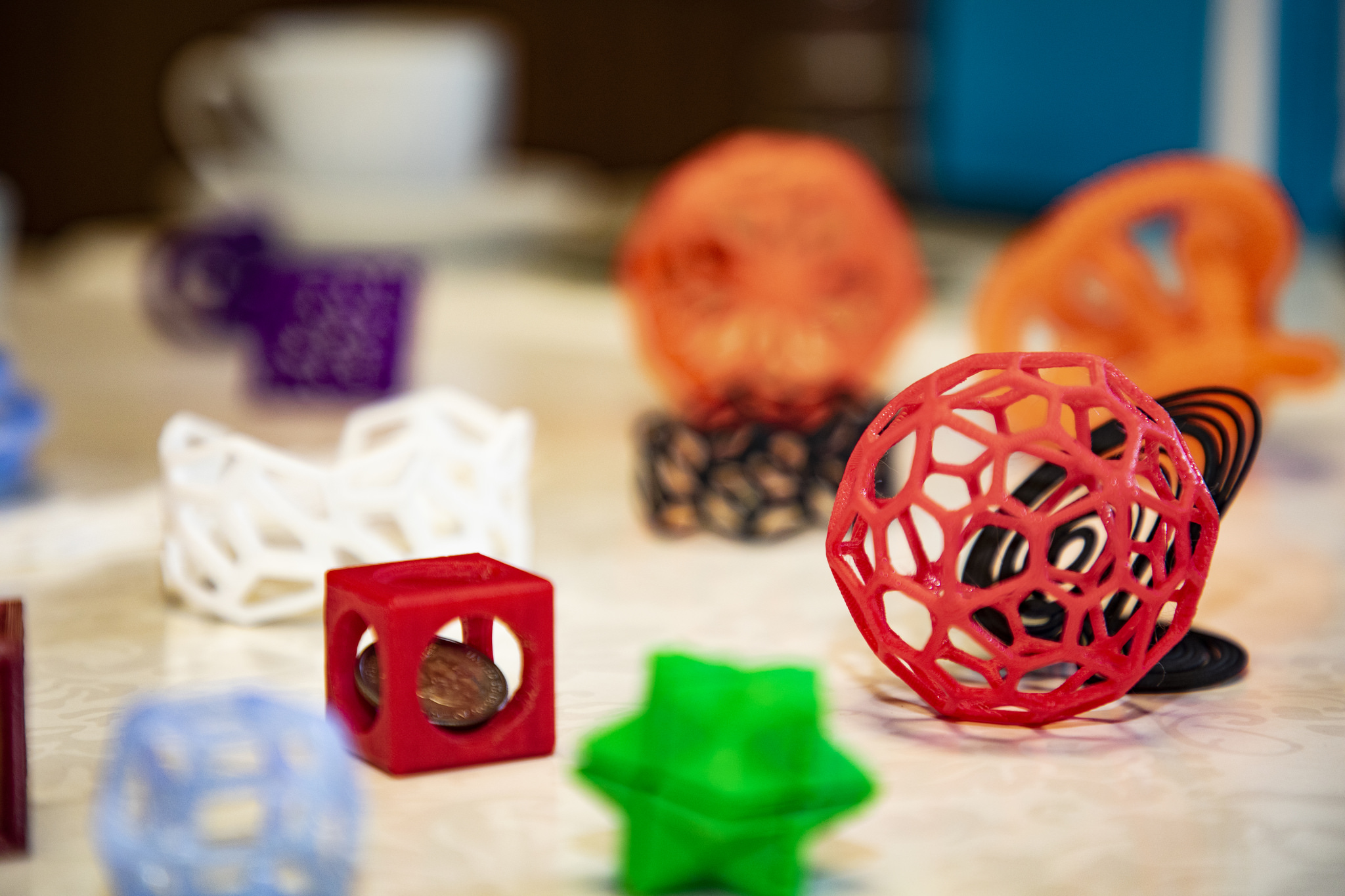
3D Printing and Mathematics models by Taalman

In 2013–2014, after becoming head of the 3d printing lab at James Madison University, Taalman set out on a project of printing one 3d model per day. Her models have included subjects from mathematics including knots, fractals, and snap-together polyhedra.

== Books ==
With Peter Kohn, Taalman is the author of a textbook Calculus. She is also the author of a different text, Calculus I with Integrated Precalculus.

With Jason Rosenhouse (also a mathematics professor at James Madison University) she is the author of Taking Sudoku Seriously: The Mathematics Behind the World’s Most Popular Pencil Puzzle. She has also written a series of Sudoku puzzle books with Philip Riley.

== Awards and honors ==
Taalman won the Trevor Evans Award of the Mathematical Association of America in 2003 for her work with Eugénie Hunsicker on the mathematics of modular architecture.

In 2005, Taalman won the Henry L. Alder Award for Distinguished Teaching by a Beginning College or University Mathematics Faculty Member, given by the Mathematical Association of America.

Her book Taking Sudoku Seriously was the 2012 winner of the PROSE Awards in the popular science and popular mathematics category.
