= Eugénie Hunsicker =

American mathematician and researcher

Dr Eugénie Lee Hunsicker
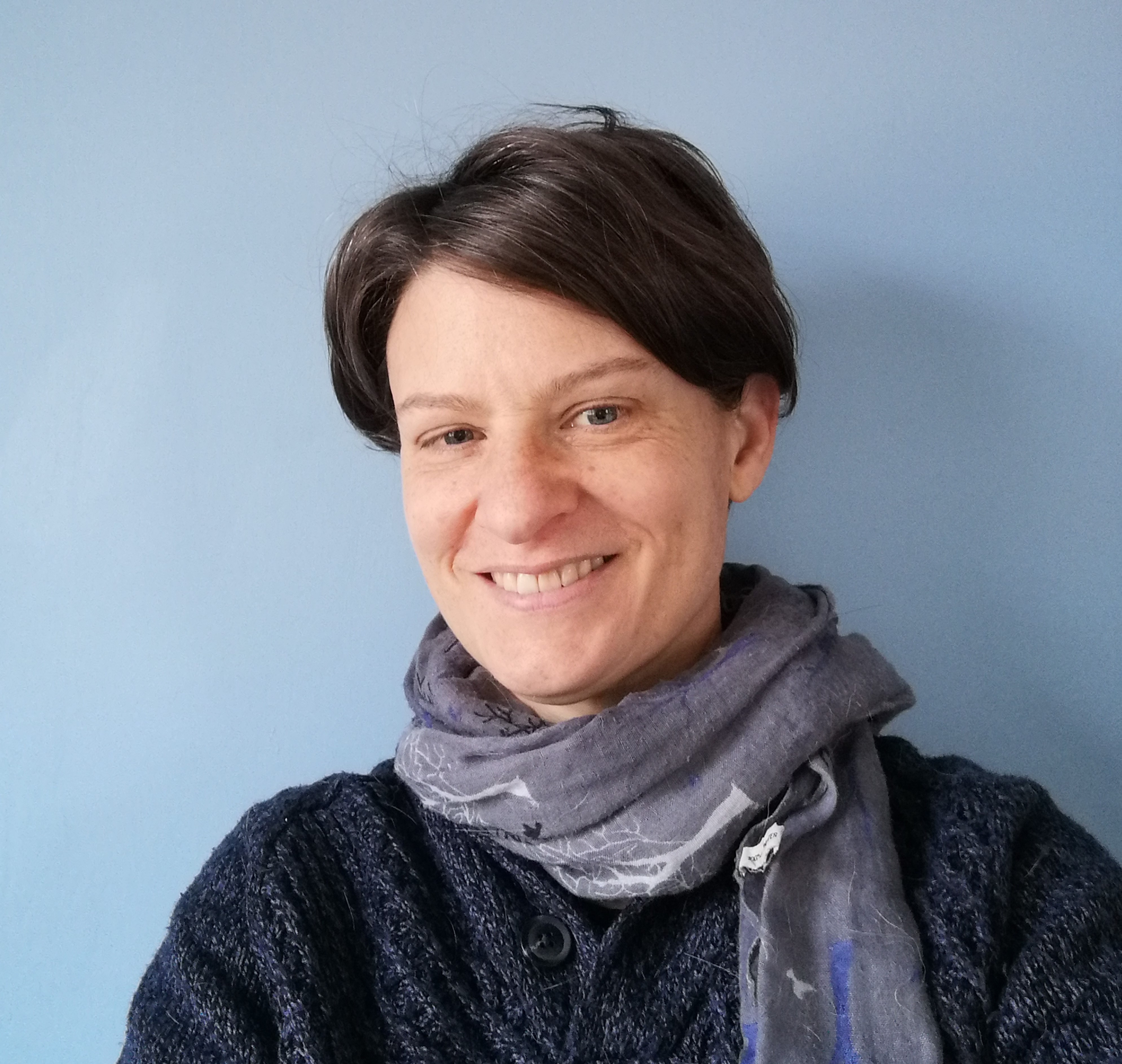
- Portrait of American Mathematician Eugenie Hunsicker in 2020
- Education: Haverford College, University of Chicago
- Employer: Loughborough University
- Awards: Suffrage Science Award (2018)

Eugénie Lee Hunsicker is an American mathematician who works at Loughborough University in England as a senior lecturer in pure mathematics and as director of equality and diversity for the school of science. Her research in pure mathematics has concerned topics "at the intersection of analysis, geometry and topology"; she has also worked on more applied topics in data science and image classification.

== Education and career ==
Hunsicker grew up in Iowa City, and was inspired to do mathematics in part by a high school teacher who was married to a mathematics professor at the University of Iowa. She went to Haverford College, where she was mentored by mathematician Curtis Greene, including two summers of mathematical research with Greene. She also visited the University of Oxford as an exchange student, and earned an honorable mention for the 1992 Alice T. Schafer Prize for excellence in mathematics by an undergraduate woman, won that year by Zvezdelina Stankova. Hunsicker graduated from Haverford magna cum laude in 1992, and went on to graduate study at the University of Chicago, supported in part by a fellowship from the American Association of University Women. Her 1999 dissertation, L(2)-Cohomology and L(2)-Harmonic Forms for Complete Noncompact Kähler and Warped Product Metrics, was jointly supervised by Melvin G. Rothenberg and Kevin Corlette.

She went straight from her doctorate to a faculty position at Lawrence University, a liberal arts college focused primarily on undergraduate teaching, but five years later found herself missing the research life, and after earning tenure she went on the academic job market again. She applied to Loughborough "almost on a whim" after a honeymoon visit to England, and moved there in 2006.

== Film ==
In 2018, as Chair of the London Mathematical Society Women in Maths Committee, Hunsicker worked with filmmaker Irina Linke to produce a short film on Faces of Women in Mathematics.

== Recognition ==
Hunsicker won the Trevor Evans Award of the Mathematical Association of America in 2003 for her work with Laura Taalman on the mathematics of modular architecture. In 2018, she won the Suffrage Science Award for Mathematics and Computing "for her achievements in science and for her work encouraging others to aim for leadership roles in the sector". She was selected as a Fellow of the Association for Women in Mathematics in the Class of 2021 "for leadership of the United Kingdom community of women in mathematics; tireless advocacy for women in mathematics everywhere through talks, writing, and the film 'Faces of Women in Mathematics'; and application of mathematical and statistical expertise to research into equity and diversity issues facing the mathematical community".
