= Tanner graph =

Bipartite graph in coding theory

In coding theory, a Tanner graph is a bipartite graph that can be used to express constraints (typically equations) that specify an error correcting code. Tanner graphs play a central role in the design and decoding of low-density parity-check codes. They have also been applied to the construction of longer codes from smaller ones. Both encoders and decoders employ these graphs extensively.

== Origins ==
Tanner graphs were proposed by Michael Tanner as a means to create larger error correcting codes from smaller ones using recursive techniques. He generalized the techniques of Peter Elias for product codes.

Tanner discussed lower bounds on the codes obtained from these graphs irrespective of the specific characteristics of the codes which were being used to construct larger codes.

== Use for linear block codes ==
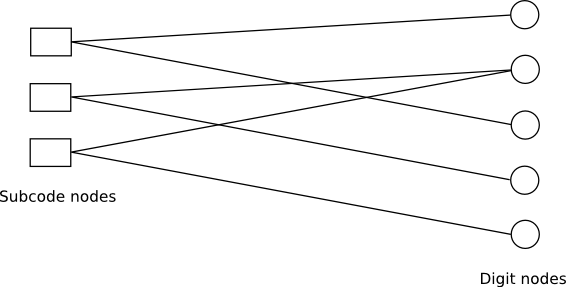
Tanner graph with subcode and digit nodes

Tanner graphs are partitioned into subcode nodes and digit nodes. For linear block codes, the subcode nodes denote rows of the parity-check matrix H. The digit nodes represent the columns of the matrix H. An edge connects a subcode node to a digit node if a nonzero entry exists in the intersection of the corresponding row and column.

== Bounds proven by Tanner ==
Tanner proved the following bounds

Let $R$ be the rate of the resulting linear code, let the degree of the digit nodes be $m$ and the degree of the subcode nodes be $n$. If each subcode node is associated with a linear code (n,k) with rate r = k/n, then the rate of the code is bounded by

$$R \geq 1 - (1 - r)m \,$$

== Computational complexity of Tanner graph based methods ==
The advantage of these recursive techniques is that they are computationally tractable. The coding algorithm for Tanner graphs is extremely efficient in practice, although it is not guaranteed to converge except for cycle-free graphs, which are known not to admit asymptotically good codes.

== Applications ==
Zemor's decoding algorithm, which is a recursive low-complexity approach to code construction, is based on Tanner graphs.

== Notes ==
- Michael Tanner's Original paper
- Michael Tanner's page
