= Jason Rosenhouse =

American author and mathematician

- Born: 1973 (age 52–53)
- Education: Brown University (BS); Dartmouth College (MA, PhD)
- Scientific career
- Fields: Mathematics
- Workplaces: James Madison University; Kansas State University
- Doctoral advisor: Dorothy Wallace

Jason Rosenhouse is an American author and professor of mathematics at James Madison University. His research focuses on algebraic graph theory, as well as analytic number theory. He ran the Evolution Blog at National Geographic's ScienceBlogs, where he was a frequent critic of creationism, he has contributed to the pro-evolution blog The Panda's Thumb, and he has written for the HuffPost on topics such as the Higgs boson. He is also the author and editor of several books on recreational mathematics.

== Personal life ==
Jason grew up in New Jersey. While in middle school and high school, he was a prolific chess player, attending both tournaments and chess camp.

== Education ==
Rosenhouse has a bachelor's degree from Brown University in mathematics (1995), and an M.A. (1997) and PhD in mathematics (2000), both from Dartmouth College. His PhD thesis was entitled "Isoperimetric numbers of certain Cayley graphs associated to PSL (2, [zeta subscript n])".

== Career ==
In 2000, Rosenhouse accepted a position at Kansas State University's mathematics department, at a time when the state school board was embroiled in a dispute over teaching creationism in schools. The school board's elimination of evolution from science textbooks introduced him to the creationist community, and he says that his time spent with them has convinced him that "the task of reconciling science with faith is far more difficult than is sometimes pretended." He was appointed assistant professor at James Madison University in 2003 and full professor in 2014.

== Selected publications ==
=== Peer-reviewed papers ===
- Cochrane, T.; Pinner, C.; Rosenhouse, J. (2003). "BOUNDS ON EXPONENTIAL SUMS AND THE POLYNOMIAL WARING PROBLEM MOD p". Journal of the London Mathematical Society. 67 (2): 319. doi:10.1112/S0024610702004040. S2CID 15630311.
- Rosenhouse, J. (2002). "Probability, Optimization Theory, and Evolution". Evolution. 56 (8): 1721–1723. doi:10.1554/0014-3820(2002)056[1721:POTAE]2.0.CO;2. S2CID 85618870.
- Lanphier, D.; Rosenhouse, J. (2004). "Cheeger constants of Platonic graphs". Discrete Mathematics. 277 (1–3): 101–113. doi:10.1016/S0012-365X(03)00178-X.

=== Books ===
- The Monty Hall Problem: The Remarkable Story of Math's Most Contentious Brain Teaser, Oxford University Press
- Among the Creationists: Dispatches from the Anti-Evolutionist Front Line, Oxford University Press
- Taking Sudoku Seriously: The Math Behind the World's Most Popular Pencil Puzzle, Oxford University Press
- Games for Your Mind: The History and Future of Logic Puzzles , Princeton University Press
