= Ilan Adler =

Israeli-American operations researcher

Ilan Adler is an Israeli-American operations researcher, and a Chancellor's Professor at the University of California, Berkeley, in the Department of Industrial Engineering and Operations Research. His research concerns mathematical programming, polyhedral combinatorics, and algorithmic game theory, including interior-point methods for linear programming and convex programming, and the equivalence between linear programs and zero-sum games.

Adler graduated from the Hebrew University of Jerusalem in 1966 with a bachelor's degree in economics and statistics. After receiving a master's degree in operations research at the Technion – Israel Institute of Technology in 1967, he continued his studies at Stanford University, where he completed his Ph.D. in 1970. His dissertation, Abstract Polytopes, was supervised by George Dantzig.

He joined the UC Berkeley faculty in 1970, and chaired the Department of Industrial Engineering and Operations Research from 2005 to 2008. He has also held affiliations with Tsinghua University and the Tsinghua–Berkeley Shenzhen Institute.
