= Miyamoto (surname) =

Miyamoto (宮本, ミヤモト, lit. 'base of the shrine') is a Japanese surname. Notable people with the surname include:

- Amon Miyamoto (born 1958), theatre director
- Andy Miyamoto (1933–2017), American baseball player
- Ariana Miyamoto (born 1994), beauty queen
- Eiji Miyamoto (born 1998), footballer
- Emiko Miyamoto (1937–2023), volleyball player
- Emiri Miyamoto (born 1983), violinist
- Etsuko Miyamoto (born 1943), sprinter
- Fumiaki Miyamoto (born 1949), oboist and conductor
- Fumiharu Miyamoto (born 1969), cyclist
- Gervin Miyamoto, American politician
- Hazuki Miyamoto (born 2000), diver
- Hiroji Miyamoto (born 1966), rock singer
- Hiroshi Miyamoto (born 1986), shogi player
- Miyamoto Iori (1612–1678), samurai
- Kanako Miyamoto, (born 1989) voice actress and singer
- Karin Miyamoto (born 1998), idol singer, former Juice=Juice member
- Katsufumi Miyamoto (born 1966), rugby player
- Katsumasa Miyamoto (born 1972), golfer
- Kazushi Miyamoto (born 1979), professional wrestler
- Kazuko Miyamoto (born 1942), American artist
- Kazutomo Miyamoto (born 1964), baseball player
- Keisuke Miyamoto (born 1992), kickboxer
- Kenji Miyamoto (figure skater) (born 1978), figure skater
- Kenji Miyamoto (politician) (1908–2007), politician
- Kit Miyamoto (born 1963), American engineer
- Koji Miyamoto, professional wrestling historian
- Kota Miyamoto (born 1996), footballer
- Masafumi Miyamoto (born 1957), businessman and founder of video game company Square (now Square Enix)
- Mari Miyamoto, footballer
- Masao Miyamoto (1948–1999), psychiatrist and former civil servant
- Masakatsu Miyamoto (1938–2002), footballer
- Masami Miyamoto (born 1934), diver
- Masanori Miyamoto (born 1997), weightlifter
- Mei Miyamoto (born 1998), kickboxer
- Miyamoto Mikinosuke (1604–1626), retainer
- Mitsuru Miyamoto (born 1958), actor
- Miyamoto Musashi (1584–1645), historical swordsman and Rōnin
- Moka Miyamoto (born 1999), wrestler and karateka
- Naoki Miyamoto (1934–2012), Go player
- Nobuko Miyamoto (born 1945), actress
- Nobuko JoAnne Miyamoto (born 1939), American folk singer
- Patricia Castañeda Miyamoto (born 1990), Mexican swimmer
- Paul Miyamoto, sheriff
- Ryūji Miyamoto (born 1947), photographer
- Sheridan Miyamoto, American researcher
- Shigeru Miyamoto (born 1952), video game designer
- Shinya Miyamoto (born 1970), baseball player
- Shozo Miyamoto (born 1940), golfer
- Shūmei Miyamoto (born 1996), baseball player
- Shunichi Miyamoto (born 1986), musician and voice actor
- Takeshi Miyamoto, politician
- Takeshi Miyamoto (baseball) (born 1995), baseball player
- Takuya Miyamoto (footballer, 1983–2022), footballer
- Takuya Miyamoto (footballer, born 1993), footballer
- Teru Miyamoto (born 1947), author, recipient of the Akutagawa Prize
- Teruki Miyamoto (1940–2000), footballer
- Teruko Miyamoto (born 1952), basketball player
- Tetsuya Miyamoto (born 1959), mathematics teacher, inventor of KenKen
- Tomomi Miyamoto (born 1978), footballer
- Toru Miyamoto (born 1982), footballer
- Toru Miyamoto (politician) (born 1972), politician
- Toshiaki Miyamoto (born 1999), footballer
- Toshiko Miyamoto (born 1954), gymnast
- Tsuneyasu Miyamoto (born 1977), footballer
- Yasuhiro Miyamoto (born 1948), golfer
- Yukihiro Miyamoto (born 1977), anime director
- Yuko Miyamoto (born 1982), wrestler
- Yume Miyamoto (born 1997), actress
- Yuta Miyamoto (born 1999), footballer
- Miyamoto Yuriko (1899–1951), novelist and activist

== Fictional characters ==
- Miyamoto Usagi, from the comic "Usagi Yojimbo"
- Carlos Miyamoto, a playable character in Final Fight 2
- Masashi Miyamoto, a character in the 2012 anime Btooom!
- Terunosuke Miyamoto, an antagonist from the manga series JoJo's Bizarre Adventure: Diamond Is Unbreakable
- Musashi Miyamoto (Vagabond), a protagonist of the manga series Vagabond

== See also ==
- Miyamoto is also the name of a 16th-century village (in present-day Mimasaka, Okayama) considered the birthplace of Miyamoto Musashi
- Miyamoto International, company founded by Kit Miyamoto
