= F. William Blaisdell =

American trauma surgeon (1927–2020)

Frank William Blaisdell (August 30, 1927 – April 18, 2020) is considered the father of modern trauma care and a pioneer in the field of vascular surgery. Blaisdell worked in the Veteran’s Health Administration system, at San Francisco General Hospital, and the UC Davis Medical Center in Northern California.

== Early life ==
Blaisdell was born on August 30, 1927 in Santa Barbara, California. Raised in Watsonville, CA, Blaisdell came from a family of physicians dating back to the American Civil War. The story of his great-grandfather surviving a shot to the chest while serving in the Union’s 12th New Hampshire Regiment, was told to Blaisdell as a young child and sparked a life-long interest in wartime injury care.

== Education ==
Blaisdell received a Bachelor's of Science from Stanford University in 1948, and then attended Stanford Medical School. Upon his graduation from medical school, Blaisdell served as a medical officer aboard a U.S. naval destroyer in the Mediterranean for two years, and then as an intern at Philadelphia General Hospital. After his internship, Blaisdell started his residency at Stanford University Medical Center, which was located in San Francisco at the time, and completed it as senior and chief resident at San Francisco General Hospital. Finally, Blaisdell completed a cardiovascular surgical fellowship under Michael DeBakey and Denton Cooley at the Texas Medical Center in Houston. Blaisdell “was board certified in general, thoracic, vascular, and critical care surgery."

== Career ==
=== Work with the Veteran’s Health Administration ===
In 1960, Blaisdell returned to San Francisco to begin his tenure as Chief of Surgery for the Veteran’s Administration Hospital at Fort Miley. There, Blaisdell helped start the first Veteran’s Administration open heart program in the Bay area, which opened in 1963.

=== Trauma care in San Francisco ===
In 1966, Blaisdell became chief of the University of California’s Blue Surgery Service unit at San Francisco General Hospital. As chief of SFGH, Blaisdell helped create the nation’s first city-wide trauma system with a 24/7 in-house surgical team. He organized the city and county ambulances to deliver all traumas to SFGH, even riding along with paramedics on some occasions to learn the system. SFGH remains today as the only Level 1 Trauma Center in San Francisco and northern San Mateo.

=== Vascular surgery ===
Alongside his trauma work, Blaisdell devised the axillary–femoral bypass in 1962 and contributed to the understanding of blood coagulation. Blaisdell received two NIH grants, first from 1960-66, second from 1966-76, to study cerebrovascular disease.

In the 1960s, Blaisdell was involved in a randomized trial for carotid endarterectomy, and his report includes findings that are still relevant today. At this time, Blaisdell was also involved in early reports of cerebrospinal fluid pressure changes in spinal cord ischemia patients, which informed further studies on prophylactic CSF drainage to prevent spinal cord ischemia during certain surgeries.

Additionally, Blaisdell conducted laboratory studies on the risk of heparin-induced bleeding and led participation of the University of California Medical Center in the multicenter randomized controlled trial “Joint Study of Extracranial Arterial Occlusion." This study informed our current clinical understanding of the mechanism of thrombosis. As a testament to his contributions to the field, Blaisdell was President of the Society for Vascular Surgery from 1979-80.

=== UC Davis Medical Center ===
In 1978, Blaisdell became chair of the Department of Surgery at the UC Davis Medical Center in Sacramento, California. Blaisdell led the UC Davis Department of Surgery and saw it gain national rank and recognition. Blaisdell was instrumental in setting up the UC Davis Medical Center 24/7 trauma program, which today is the only one in the California Capital region with Level I certification. In addition to the trauma program, Blaisdell also implemented a program for training military and civilian residents side-by-side.

=== Bobby Hurley ===
In the early 1990s, Sacramento Kings first-round pick rookie guard Bobby Hurley was hospitalized at the University of California Medical Center after a life-threatening car accident with two collapsed lungs, broken ribs, and additional head and back injuries. Blaisdell conducted Hurley’s surgery, held hospital news conferences on Hurley’s condition, and commented on Hurley’s extensive recovery process for news reporters nationally.

=== Retirement ===
Blaisdell stepped down as chair at the University of California Medical Center in the late 1990s, and transitioned to focus solely on his teaching duties there. After his retirement in 2002, Blaisdell continued to be involved in the medical field, devoting time to his research on Civil War medicine and serving as president of the Naffziger Surgical Society 2010-2011.

== Personal life ==
Blaisdell married Marilyn Janeck in December 1950. They would go on to have six children together and fourteen grandchildren. His hobbies included magic, model airplanes, slot-car racing, tennis, and writing.

== Death ==
On April 18, 2020, Blaisdell died from a stroke in his San Francisco home. He was 93 years old. Blaisdell was memorialized by the various groups and organizations that he was a part of, including University of California at Davis, San Francisco General Hospital, Stanford University, and the Veteran’s Association.

== Awards, honors, and legacy ==
Due to his work, Blaisdell has been dubbed by many as the “father of modern trauma care” and as a pioneer of vascular surgery. After his retirement, Blaisdell was awarded The J.E. Wallace Sterling Lifetime Achievement Award in Medicine from Stanford Medicine Alumni Association in 2001 and the Distinguished Service Award from the American College of Surgeons in 2002.

The UC Davis Medical Center Library was renamed in Blaisdell’s honor in 2006 after the library received a donation from Blaisdell in the form of his Civil War Medicine collection, which contains over 400 titles relating to wartime medical and nursing practice. The F. William Blaisdell Medical Library is located in Sacramento, California on the UC Davis Health campus.

== Selected works ==
- Blaisdell, F. W., & Cooley, D. A. (1962). The mechanism of paraplegia after temporary thoracic aortic occlusion and its relationship to spinal fluid pressure. Surgery, 51(3), 351-355.
- Blaisdell, F. W., & Hall, A. D. (1963). Axillary-femoral artery bypass for lower extremity ischemia. Surgery, 54(4), 563–568.
- Blaisdell, F. W., Hall, A. D., & Thomas, A. N. (1965). Ligation treatment of an abdominal aortic aneurysm. The American Journal of Surgery, 109(5), 560–565.
- Blaisdell, F. W., Hall, A. D., Thomas, A. N., & Ross, S. J. (1965). Cerebrovascular Occlusive Disease—Experience with Panarteriography in 300 Consecutive Cases. California Medicine, 103(5), 321–329.
- Lim, R. C., Blaisdell, F. W., Choy, S. H., Hall, A. D., & Thomas, A. N. (1966). Massive pulmonary microembolism in regional shock. Surgical Forum, 17, 13–15.
- Blaisdell, F. W., Lim, R., & Hall, A. D. (1967). Technical result of carotid endarterectomy: Arteriographic assessment. The American Journal of Surgery, 114(2), 239–246.
- Schrock, T., Blaisdell, F. W., & Mathewson, C. (1968). Management of blunt trauma to the liver and hepatic veins. Archives of Surgery, 96(5), 698-704.
- Blaisdell, F. W., & Graziano, C. J. (1978). Assessment of clotting by the determination of fibrinogen catabolism. The American Journal of Surgery, 135(3), 436–443.
- Effeney, D. J., McIntyre, K. E., Blaisdell, F. W., & Graziano, C. J. (1978). Fibrinogen kinetics in major human burns. Surgical Forum, 29, 56–59.
- Effeney, D. J., Case, S. A., Graziano, C., & Blaisdell, F. W. (1979). Distribution and clearance of radioactive heparin. Surgical Forum, 30, 198–199.
- Blaisdell, F. W. (1979). Low-dose heparin prophylaxis of venous thrombosis: An editorial. American Heart Journal, 97(6), 685–686.
- Kashtan, J., Conti, S., & Blaisdell, F. W. (1980). Heparin therapy for deep venous thrombosis. The American Journal of Surgery, 140(6), 836-840
- Blaisdell, F. W. (1985). Trauma Myths and Magic: 1984 Fitts Lecture. Journal of Trauma and Acute Care Surgery, 25(9), 856.
- Owings, J. T., & Blaisdell, F. W. (1996), Low-dose heparin thromboembolism prophylaxis. Archives of Surgery, 131(10), 1069-1073.
- Blaisdell, F. W., San Francisco General Hospital Foundation., & Grossman, M. (1999). Catastrophes, epidemics, and neglected diseases : San Francisco General Hospital and the evolution of public care. San Francisco General Hospital Foundation.
- Blaisdell, F. W. (2002). The pathophysiology of skeletal muscle ischemia and the reperfusion syndrome: a review. Cardiovascular surgery, 10(6), 620-630.
