= Kenken =

Kenken may refer to:

- KenKen puzzle
- KenKen, Japanese musician and bassist of the band Rize
- Kenken (bell), of Kouroussa in northwestern Guinea
