= Seizō =

- Gender: Male

Origin
- Origin: Japanese
- Meaning: Different meanings depending on the kanji used

Seizō, Seizo, Seizou or Seizoh (written: 精三, 省三 or せいぞう in hiragana) is a masculine Japanese given name. Notable people with the name include:

- Seizō Fukumoto (福本 清三; 1943–2021), Japanese actor
- Seizō Katō (加藤 精三; 1927–2014), Japanese voice actor
- Seizō Kobayashi (小林 躋造; 1877–1962), Imperial Japanese Navy admiral and Governor-General of Taiwan
- Sakonji Seizō (左近司 政三; 1879–1969), Imperial Japanese Navy admiral
- Seizo Suzuki (鈴木 省三; 1913–2000), Japanese horticulturist
- Seizō Wakaizumi (若泉 征三; born 1945), Japanese politician
- Seizō Watase (わたせ せいぞう; born 1945), Japanese manga artist and illustrator
- Seizō Yasunori (安則 盛三; 1924–1945), Japanese student who joined the Imperial Japanese Navy
