= Inshi no heya =

Logic puzzle

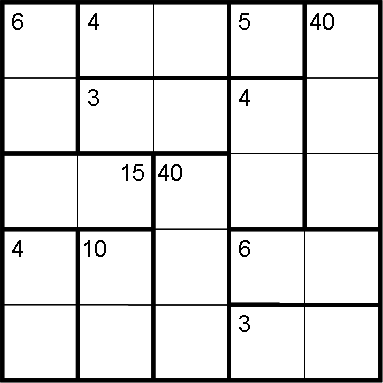
Unsolved Inshi No Heya grid

Inshi no heya ( 因子の部屋; lit. "factoring rooms") is a type of logic puzzle published by Nikoli. It is a specific form of the KenKen puzzle genre where every operation is implied to be multiplication.

== Rules ==
Inshi no heya is played on a square grid, broken into "rooms" by heavier borders. One of every room's dimensions will be a single cell; the length or width of the room varying by room.

Each room may run either horizontally or vertically, and has a small number appearing in its upper left corner.

The puzzle starts with all the cells empty.

The goal is to fill all the cells with nonzero single-digit numbers (1 through n, where n is the length of the grid's edge) such that:

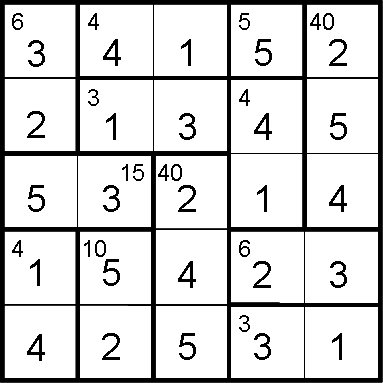
- Solved Inshi No Heya grid
  The numbers in each room, when multiplied together, equal the small number in the upper left corner of the room
- No number appears twice in a column or row

== Solution methods ==
A usual place to start are single-celled boxes, as these can be filled in trivially. Then, one can look at boxes that have only one combination of numbers that multiply to make the total. These are often prime-numbered boxes, but can also be, for example, a 2-cell 72, which must contain 8 and 9.

The "naked pairs" and "hidden pairs" techniques, often used in Sudoku, can be applied here.

One technique relies on the fact that the product of every row and column is a fixed number. For example, in a 5x5 Inshin no heya puzzle, each row/column must have a product of 120. If, in any row/column of such a puzzle, there is a 4-cell 24 clue, then the remaining cell in the row/column must be 5 to satisfy this property. Looking at the middle column in the sample puzzle, the 40 in the middle column reveals that the other two cells in that column must multiply out to 3 and therefore must consist of a 1 and 3. Since 3 is not a factor of 4, the 1 must be in the top cell and 3 must be in the second cell. This technique can also be extended to multiple rows/columns.

== History ==
Inshi no heya first appeared in Puzzle Communication Nikoli #92. Although the creator named the puzzle insū bunkai (factorization), the editor replaced it with inshi no heya, which sounds less technical. It irregularly appears in the magazine since #109.

== See also ==
- Killer sudoku, another puzzle type which is similar but somewhat different, and in particular uses addition rather than multiplication
- List of Nikoli puzzle types
