= UC Davis Comprehensive Cancer Center =

Coordinates: 38°33′14″N 121°27′9″W

The UC Davis Comprehensive Cancer Center is one of two cancer centers in Northern California designated by the federal government's National Cancer Institute for its ability to contribute to the nation's cancer research and serve as a major source of new knowledge on cancer treatment, diagnosis and prevention. It was founded in 1991 and received its NCI designation in 2002, and was promoted to "comprehensive" status in 2012. It is part of the UC Davis Medical Center in Sacramento, CA.

The center offers patients access to more than 150 clinical trials at any given time through a research program that includes more than 280 scientists. It was the first major cancer center to establish a formal research partnership with a national laboratory. The research programs at the UC Davis Comprehensive Cancer Center include biomedical technology, molecular oncology, comparative oncology, cancer therapeutics, prostate cancer, and cancer health disparities and population science. UC Davis Comprehensive Cancer Center receives more than $100 million in research funding annually.

The clinical center was opened in 2000. It encompasses 110,000 square feet and treats about 90,000 cancer patients annually.

The UC Davis Comprehensive Cancer Center is a member of the California Cancer Consortium and Association of American Cancer Institutes.
