= Sheridan Miyamoto =

American forensic nurse practitioner

Academic background
- Education: BA, psychology, University of California, Davis; MS, nursing, Vanderbilt University; PhD, Nursing Science and Health-Care Leadership, Betty Irene Moore School of Nursing
- Thesis: Risk factors for serious child maltreatment in families previously investigated by CPS: a case-control study (2014)

Academic work
- Institutions: Pennsylvania State University

Sheridan Whalen Miyamoto is an American forensic nurse practitioner and researcher. She is an associate professor at the Ross and Carol Nese College of Nursing at Pennsylvania State University, director of the Sexual Assault Forensic Examination Telehealth (SAFE-T) Center, and founder and Chief Scientific Officer of SAFE-T System, LLC. She is a Fellow of the American Academy of Nursing.

== Early life and education ==
Miyamoto completed a Bachelor of Arts degree at the University of California, Davis and a Master of Science in nursing from Vanderbilt University. Following her master's degree, Miyamoto worked for more than a decase as a family nurse practitioner and pediatric sexual assault examiner at the UC Davis Health System's CAARE (Child and Adolescent Abuse Resource and Evaluation) Diagnostic and Treatment Center, where she conducted more than 3,000 forensic sexual abuse examinations and provided expert testimony in over 60 criminal court cases. She returned to UC Davis for doctoral training, completing a PhD in Nursing Science and Healthcare Leadership at the Betty Irene Moore School of Nursing and her doctoral training was supported by a Jonas Scholar award and a Doris Duke Fellowship for the Promotion of Child Well-Being.

== Career ==
Miyamoto joined Penn State's Ross and Carol Nese College of Nursing as an assistant professor in 2015, was promoted to associate professor in 2021, and holds joint faculty appointments in the College of Nursing and the Child Maltreatment Solutions Network. While completing her fellowship, Miyamoto met Jennie Noll who directed Pennsylvania State University's (PSU) Network on Child Protection and Well-Being.

=== SAFE-T Center and SAFE-T System ===
In 2016, Miyamoto received a planning grant from the U.S. Department of Justice (DOJ) Office for Victims of Crime (OVC) to design a telehealth model for sexual assault forensic examinations in rural communities. This led to the launch of the Sexual Assault Forensic Examination Telehealth (SAFE-T) Center in 2016 and further supported by a $3 million DOJ/OVC implementation grant. The SAFE-T model enables nurses in rural and under resourced settings to perform sexual assault examinations by partnering with expert Sexual Assault Nurse Examiners (SANEs) via live telehealth, providing real-time mentoring, quality assurance, and evidence-based training.

Sustained federal (National Institutes of Health (NIH), Health Resources and Services Administration (HRSA), DOJ/OVC), state (Pennsylvania Commission on Crime and Deliquency (PCCD)), and foundation (Betty Irene Moore Fellowship for Nurse Leaders and Innovators and the Rita and Alex Hillman Foundation) funding has driven the ongoing development, growth and scaling of the SAFE-T System.

Miyamoto's research has directly influenced legislation. In December 2023, Pennsylvania Governor Josh Shapiro signed the Sexual Assualt Emergency Services Act (Act 59), expanding access to SANE care across Pennsylvania. In May 2024, Maryland Governor Wes Moore signed Senate Bill 950 providing for reimbursement of telehealth sexual assault forensic examination; Miyamoto provided invited testimony to the Maryland legislature in support of the bill.

In 2025, Miyamoto founded SAFE-T System, LLC, a commercial entity formed to scale the SAFE-T System specialty forensic service to communities lacking access to expert sexual assault care, and to make the supporting telehealth technology commercially available to support forensic nursing care in all settings.

=== Recognition ===
In July 2020, Miyamoto was one of eleve nurse scientists accepted to the inaugural cohort of the Betty Irene Moore Fellowships for Nurse Leaders and Innovators, a national program funded by the Gordon and Betty Moore Foundation. In August 2020, she was inducted as a Fellow of the American Academy of Nursing. In 2023, the SAFE-T System was named Rural Health Program of the Year by the Pennsylvania Office of Rural Health. In 2025, the SAFE-T System team received the American Nurses Association Innovation Award. Also in 2025, the SAFE-T System model was awarded the American Academy of Nursing Edge Runner designation which recognizes nurse-designed models of care that reduce cost, improve quality, and advance health equity.
