= Fumiaki Miyamoto =

Japanese classical oboist and conductor (born 1949)

- Born: November 3, 1949 (age 76)
- Genres: Classical
- Occupations: Musician, conductor
- Instrument: Oboe

Fumiaki Miyamoto (宮本文昭, Miyamoto Fumiaki) (born November 3, 1949) is a Japanese classical oboist and conductor.

== Career ==
Miyamoto started his oboe lesson at Toho Gakuen High School with Seizo Suzuki, and began his worldwide career at the age of 18, when he moved to Germany to study with Helmut Winschermann.

He played in the municipal symphony orchestra in Essen, the Frankfurt Radio Symphony, and then WDR Symphony Orchestra Cologne; he was the first Japanese oboist to hold first chair in Europe. He continued to live there until the year 2000, in which he returned to Japan. He has released several albums, not only in classical but also in pop fields like jazz, film music.

Miyamoto is a professor of the Tokyo College of Music. He has announced his retirement as a professional oboist and performed his last concert at the end of March 2007 and now active as a conductor. His second daughter is also a well-known violinist, Emiri Miyamoto.
