= Emiri Miyamoto =

Japanese violinist (born 1983)

Emiri Miyamoto 宮本 笑里
- Born: December 7, 1983 (age 42); Tokyo, Japan
- Genres: Classical music
- Occupation: Violinist
- Instrument: Violin
- Years active: 2003–present
- Label: Sony Music Entertainment Japan

Emiri Miyamoto (宮本 笑里, Miyamoto Emiri) (born December 7, 1983), is a Japanese violinist. She is the second daughter of retired oboe player Fumiaki Miyamoto.

== Discography ==
=== Singles ===
Year	Title	Notes
2008	"fantasy"	
2008	"Tokyo et Paris"	(Note: As "Emiri Miyamoto × solita".)
2009	"Inochi no Hoshi"	
