= Tetsuya Miyamoto =

Japanese mathematics teacher (born 1959)

- 宮本 哲也
- Born: 1959 (age 66–67)
- Education: Waseda University
- Occupation: Mathematics teacher
- Known for: Inventing KenKen

Tetsuya Miyamoto (宮本 哲也, Miyamoto Tetsuya; born 1959) is a Japanese mathematics teacher who invented the numerical logic puzzle KenKen. (It is called Kashikoku-Naru-Puzzle in Japanese, which literally means "a puzzle that makes you smarter." It is also known as Keisan Block.)

Miyamoto developed KenKen in 2003 to help his students improve their calculation skills, logical thinking and patience. His puzzle series has sold over 1.5 million copies in Japan. It was introduced to the rest of the world at the 2007 Bologna Book Fair as KenKen and has been translated into Korean, Thai, German, French, Czech, Mandarin Chinese, Simplified Chinese, Slovene, Spanish, Portuguese, and Icelandic. KenKen made its debut in The Times (London) in March 2008, and the New York Times in February 2009. The first U.S. KenKen tournament was held in March 2009 in Brooklyn, with Miyamoto in attendance.

Miyamoto graduated from Waseda University in Tokyo. He worked as an instructor at a juku (university preparatory cramming school) in Yokohama. In 1993 he founded his own school named Miyamoto Sansuu Kyoushitsu (Miyamoto Math Classroom) in Yokohama, and established his unique "non-teaching classroom" methodology called "The Art of Teaching Without Teaching". He moved his classroom to Tokyo (near Tokyo station) in 2009, and moved his classroom to Manhattan in 2015. His Manhattan class is named Miyamoto Mathematics Inc. He currently spends 8 months in New York and 4 months in Japan. He teaches KenKen to children on weekends.

He wrote over 180 books in Japanese, including his teaching methodology book called "Kyouikuron" that has been sold over 100,000 copies and the "Kashikoku-Naru-Sansuu" series that is consist of 96 math problem books that scaffold gradually.
