= Betty Irene Moore School of Nursing =

Nursing school in California

- Type: Public
- Established: 2009
- Dean: Stephen Cavanagh
- Location: Sacramento, California, USA; 38.553147°N 121.452528°W
- Website: Official website

The Betty Irene Moore School of Nursing at the University of California, Davis was established in March 2009. The school was launched through a $100 million commitment from the Gordon and Betty Moore Foundation, the nation's largest grant for nursing education. The vision of the Betty Irene Moore School of Nursing is to transform health care through nursing education and research. The school currently offers two degrees, the Doctor of Philosophy and Master of Science in Nursing Science and Health-Care Leadership. Additional programs will be phased in over the next decade.

The Betty Irene Moore School of Nursing is part of UC Davis Health, an integrated academic health system encompassing the UC Davis School of Medicine, the 613-acute-care hospital and clinical services of UC Davis Medical Center and the 800-member physician group known as the UC Davis Medical Group.

The school, located in Sacramento, California, is the fourth professional nursing program in the University of California system. The Betty Irene Moore School of Nursing shares facilities with the UC Davis School of Medicine and the UC Davis Medical Center.
