= Miyamoto International =

American structural engineering and disaster management firm

- Industry: Structural engineering and disaster management
- Founded: Sacramento, California (1946)
- Founder: Arthur A. Sauer
- Headquarters: Sacramento
- Number of locations: 25
- Area served: International (US, Costa Rica, Haiti, Liberia, Italy, Turkey, India, Nepal, Bangladesh, Thailand, Japan and New Zealand)
- Key people: Hideki Kit Miyamoto President & CEO
- Services: Earthquake strategy, structural engineering and disaster management
- Revenue: $15.1 million (2012)
- Website: www.miyamotointernational.com

Miyamoto International is a global structural engineering and disaster management firm best known for its work in California earthquake design for new and existing buildings as well as in the reconstruction of Port-au-Prince, Haiti and Christchurch, New Zealand following earthquakes in 2010 and 2011. Based in West Sacramento, California, the company has 25 offices in 12 countries worldwide.

== History ==
What would become Miyamoto International was first founded as Arthur A. Sauer - Structural Engineer, by Arthur Sauer in Sacramento, California in 1946. A former employee in the structural division of State Division of Architecture, Sauer served in World War II as a commander in the Navy Seabees, exploring a suitable site in the Pacific Northwest where an air base made of ice could be constructed (the project was canceled) before being stationed in Japan to oversee reconstruction projects until he was discharged, when he returned to Sacramento to start his own firm. As the company expanded to open offices in Stockton and Fresno, Sauer made three of his engineers, Ken Marr, Charles Grimes and Joe Wood, associates and then partners, with the company known as Sauer-Marr-Grimes-Wood Consulting Engineers until Sauer's retirement in 1979.

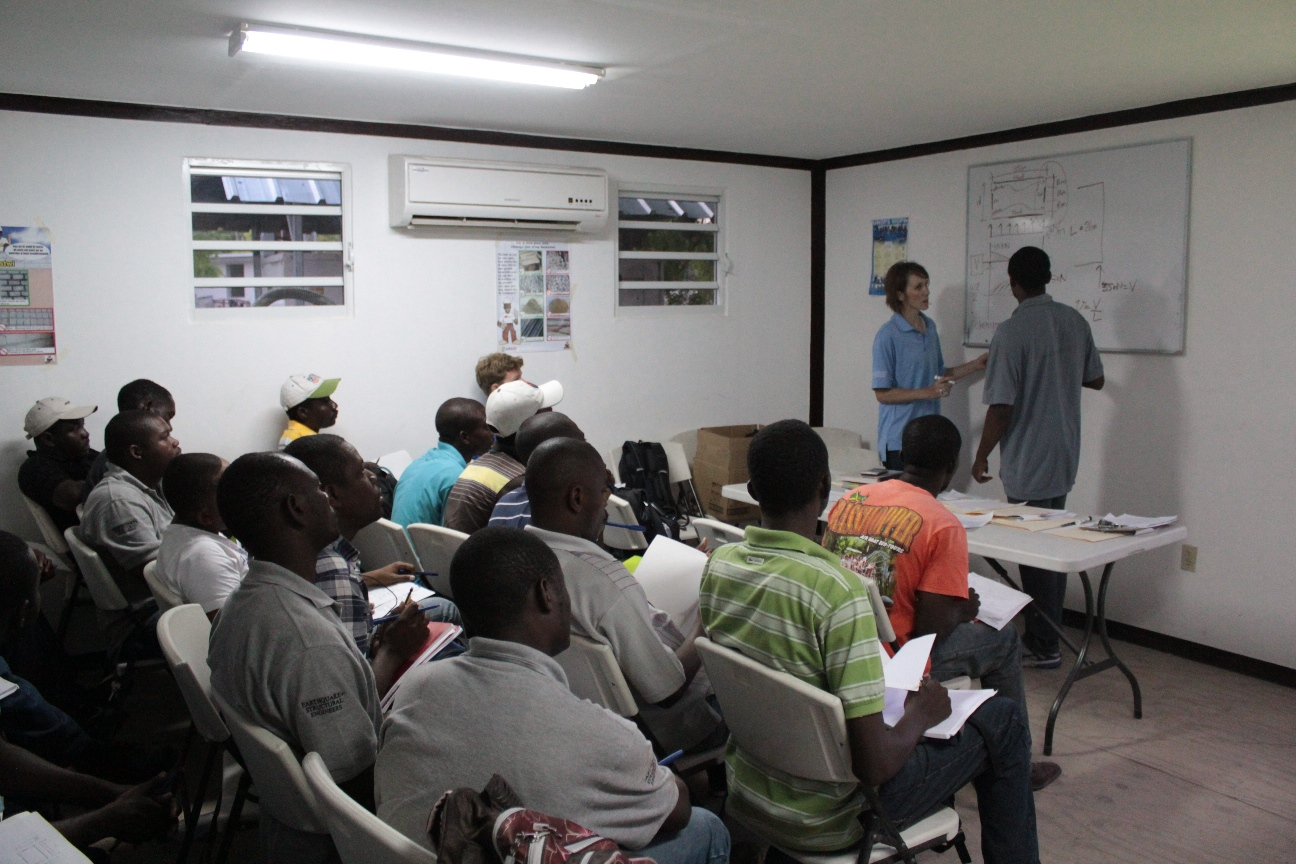
Miyamoto training masons during the reconstruction of Haiti

Kit Miyamoto joined the firm - which was at that time called Marr Shaffer & Associates - in 1989. Miyamoto was mentored by CEO John Shaffer, who retired and sold him the company in 1997, when it became Marr Shaffer & Miyamoto, Inc. In 2002, the company purchased Martin & Huang, when it became MHI Miyamoto before changing its name to Miyamoto International in 2004. Miyamoto International expanded into risk management in 2005 when it partnered with Global Risk Consultants to form Global Risk Miyamoto. In 2010, Miyamoto earned his Phd in Earthquake Engineering from the Tokyo Institute of Technology.

Following the Haiti earthquake in 2010 Miyamoto assisted in post-disaster assessment and reconstruction, and established a location as a Haitian company. In the aftermath of the 2011 earthquake in Christchurch, New Zealand, Miyamoto partnered worked on the reconstruction of Christchurch and implemented an earthquake risk reduction program in New Zealand. In 2012, Miyamoto Thailand was added to address earthquake risks in Southeast Asia. They now have offices in the US in Sacramento, San Francisco, Pleasanton, San Jose, Los Angeles, Orange County, San Diego, Las Vegas, Phoenix, Reno, Washington, D.C. and Puerto Rico, as well as international locations in Mexico, Costa Rica, Colombia, Haiti, Italy, Turkey, Uzbekistan, India, Nepal, Indonesia, Japan and New Zealand. In 2011, California Governor Edmund G. Brown Jr. appointed Kit Miyamoto to the Alfred E. Alquist Seismic Safety Commission. In 2012, he was awarded the Allied Professions Honor Award by the American Institute of Architects, California Council.

== Structural engineering, risk management and disaster response ==
Miyamoto International provides structural and earthquake engineering and disaster management for the public and private sector in the United States and internationally. They design new and retrofit existing buildings to withstand the effects of large earthquakes.

=== 2010 Earthquake in Haiti ===
On January 12, 2010, Haiti was struck by an earthquake that registered 7.0 on the Richter Scale. Some estimates quoted the death toll as high as 300,000, with another 300,000 wounded and more than one million people left homeless. In a partnership with Pan American Development Foundation (PADF), Miyamoto International arrived shortly afterward to aid local professionals in the reconstruction. The United Nations Office for Project Services (UNOPS) worked with the Haitian government and Miyamoto International in Port-au-Prince to assess the extent of the structural damage. Miyamoto International also trained locals in masonry and structural engineering so they could repair their homes or rebuild new quake-proof buildings. Over 500 locals were trained as structural engineers, and over 400,000 homes were inspected, with Miyamoto issuing a statement that most of the homes could be "repaired in less than three days for $1,000 to $1500 each." Following these events, Miyamoto International also established a permanent office in Haiti.

=== 2011 Christchurch earthquake ===
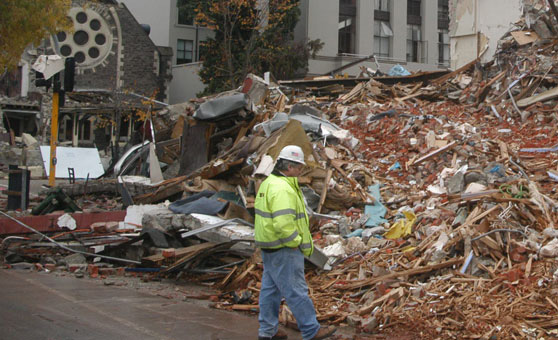
Reconstructions following the 2011 earthquake in Christchurch, New Zealand

On February 22, 2011, Christchurch, New Zealand was badly damaged by an earthquake measuring 6.3 on the Richter Scale. The reported death toll was 185 with several thousand injuries reported. Amir Gilani from Miyamoto International went to Christchurch that week to assess the extent and the causes of the damage, reporting "extensive damage to downtown buildings and widespread soil liquefaction throughout the region." Dr. Miyamoto directed the New Zealand team from his location in Haiti. Miyamoto worked with groups and individuals within the city on a structural response plan that repaired damage while attempting to retain as many buildings as possible in the city, specifically heritage buildings. Residents were severely divided when plans were announced to demolish ChristChurch Cathedral. Representatives from Miyamoto International said that the building, erected in 1904, could be preserved and made safe using modern techniques. Currently, the building has been partially deconstructed with advocacy taking up a case with the Supreme Court in New Zealand to stop its demolition.

=== 2011 Japan earthquake ===
On March 11, 2011, an earthquake measuring 9.0 occurred off Japan's east coast, resulting in a tsunami that claimed the lives of 15,883, and damaged the cooling system at the Fukushima Dai-ichi nuclear power plant. At the time, Kit Miyamoto was on a train near Ikebukuro station after delivering a speech on earthquake engineering at the Tokyo Institute of Technology, and had to walk with his family to the next station. He remained in Japan to assess the damage. He also provided technical advice regarding structural engineering issues at Sendai, an area that had been severely damaged.

== Affiliations ==
=== United Nations Global Compact ===
Miyamoto International has been a member of the United Nations Global Compact since 2011. The UN Global Compact is a strategic policy initiative for businesses committed to focusing operations on ten universally accepted principles in the areas of human rights, labor, environment and anti-corruption in order to perform ethical business practices that will benefit economies worldwide.

=== Miyamoto Global Disaster Relief ===
Kit Miyamoto is also CEO of the nonprofit, Miyamoto Global Disaster Relief, launched in 2011. The company provides technical assistance for disaster reconstruction efforts around the world in communities lacking financial resources, partnering with national governments, United Nations, and non-government organizations, using funding from private donors.

== Awards ==
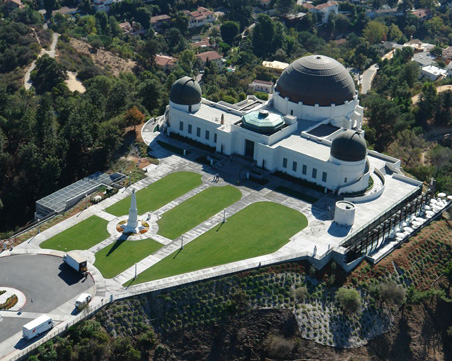
Griffith Observatory.

In 2004, Miyamoto won the Best Use of New Technology in Retrofit/Alteration Certificate of Merit Award from the Structural Engineering Association of California for their work on the Stockton Hotel. In 2005, they won two awards from the Structural Engineers Association of California (SEAOC): a Certificate of Merit in the Best Use of New Technology in New Construction category for their work on the CSUS Academic Information Center, and an Excellence Award in Landmark Structures for work on the Hollywood Bowl. In 2006, the firm's work on Golden One Credit Union Headquarters received an award as the Best of 2006 in Northern California from California Construction Magazine. In 2007, their work on the Griffith Observatory won a National Preservation Award from the National Trust for Historic Preservation. Their work on Nugget Markets won a retail design award at the Concrete Masonry Design Awards.

In 2008, the company received the award for Best Low-rise Office Building from the Precast/Pre-stressed Concrete Institute for their design work on the Golden 1 Credit Union Headquarters in Sacramento, California. In 2008, they also won a Large Project Certificate of Merit from SEAOC in the Retrofit/Alteration category for their work on Griffith Observatory in Los Angeles. In addition, the firm was ranked 63 on the list of the Top 100 Design Firms by McGraw-Hill California's Construction Magazine. In 2009, they received a President's Award in the Large Rehabilitation category from the California Preservation Foundation for work on Globe Mills in Sacramento. They also won an award for Land Development Project of the Year from the American Society of Civil Engineers (ASCE) of Orange County for its structural engineering work on the Pacific Life Insurance Company Tower.

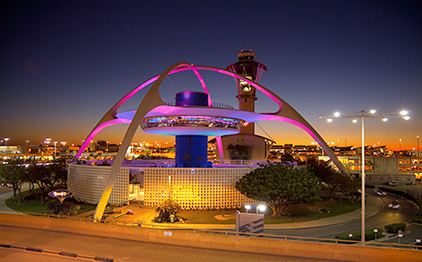
The LAX Theme Building in Los Angeles

In 2010, they won the Trustees Award for Excellence in Historic Preservation at the California Preservation Foundation's Preservation Design Awards for work on the LAX Theme Building in Los Angeles. The project also won a Large Project Award of Excellence from SEAOC in the Retrofit/Alteration category for work on the LAX Theme Building in Los Angeles. The same year, the Metro Gold Line Eastside Extension, for which Miyamoto supplied structural engineering services, won the project of the year from ASCE. Their work on Globe Mills was also recognized by ASCE with an award for outstanding historical renovation. In 2010, the company was also recognized for their work on the Eisenhower Medical Center with the AIA North Chapter Citation Award for Commercial Architecture.

In 2011, they were named the Business of the Year by Region Builders, and were named to the list of Top Structural Engineering Firms by Structural Engineer. The same year, they were number 142 on The Zweig Letter Hot Firm List, and number 50 on The Sacramento Business Journal's annual fastest-growing companies list. They were also awarded with a Humanitarian Award from SEAOC for their work in Port-au-Prince, Haiti.

In 2012, they were 93 on The Zweig Letter Hot Firm List, were named to the list of Fastest-Growing Firms by Sacramento Business Journal, and made the INC. Magazine's List of America's 5,000 Fastest Growing Companies. The company also won a Traditional Use of Wood Award from WoodWorks for their design work on Young Life's Washington Family Ranch, Creekside in Antelope, OR., a Tilt-Up Achievement Award from the Tilt-Up Concrete Association for design work on the UCSD East Campus Medical Office Building, and an Architectural Project of the Year Award from ASCE for the 7th & H Street Housing Project in Sacramento, California. The 7th & H Street Housing Project also won an Award of Merit in Responsive Design in the Special Needs Category at the 2013 Gold Nugget Awards, where the firm also won an Award of Merit in Campus Housing for the UC Davis Housing Project. In 2013, they were 86 on The Zweig Letter Hot Firm List. They also received a National Marketing Communications Video Award from the Society for Marketing Professional Services.
