= Kit Miyamoto =

Japanese-American structural engineer (born 1963)

Dr. Hideki "Kit" Miyamoto
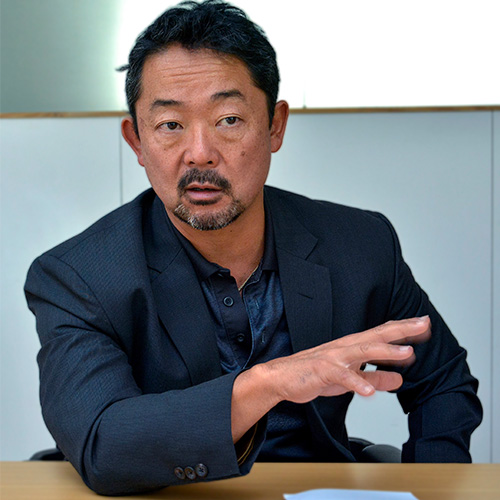
- Born: 1963 (age 62–63); Tokyo, Japan
- Education: Ph.D from Tokyo Institute of Technology, MS and BS from California State University
- Occupation: Seismic safety professional
- Known for: Miyamoto International, Earthquake disaster response

Dr. Hideki "Kit" Miyamoto (born 1963) is a Japanese-American structural engineer known for being the founder-CEO of Miyamoto International, a global structural engineering and disaster risk reduction organization. He is also the chairman of California's Alfred E. Alquist Seismic Safety Commission, which investigates earthquakes and recommends policies for risk reduction.

== Early life and education ==
Miyamoto was born and raised in Tokyo and studied earthquake engineering at the Tokyo Institute of Technology and California State University. He lives in Los Angeles.

== Career ==
Miyamoto started his career in structural engineering and later focused on disaster resiliency, response, and reconstruction. He provides policy consultation to the World Bank, USAID, UN agencies, governments and private sector. He has led teams of professionals on response and reconstruction projects after the 2008 Sichuan earthquake, 2010 Haiti earthquake, 2011 Japan earthquake, 2015 Nepal earthquake, 2020 Puerto Rico earthquakes and other seismic risk reduction programs along with disaster risk mitigation policy work.

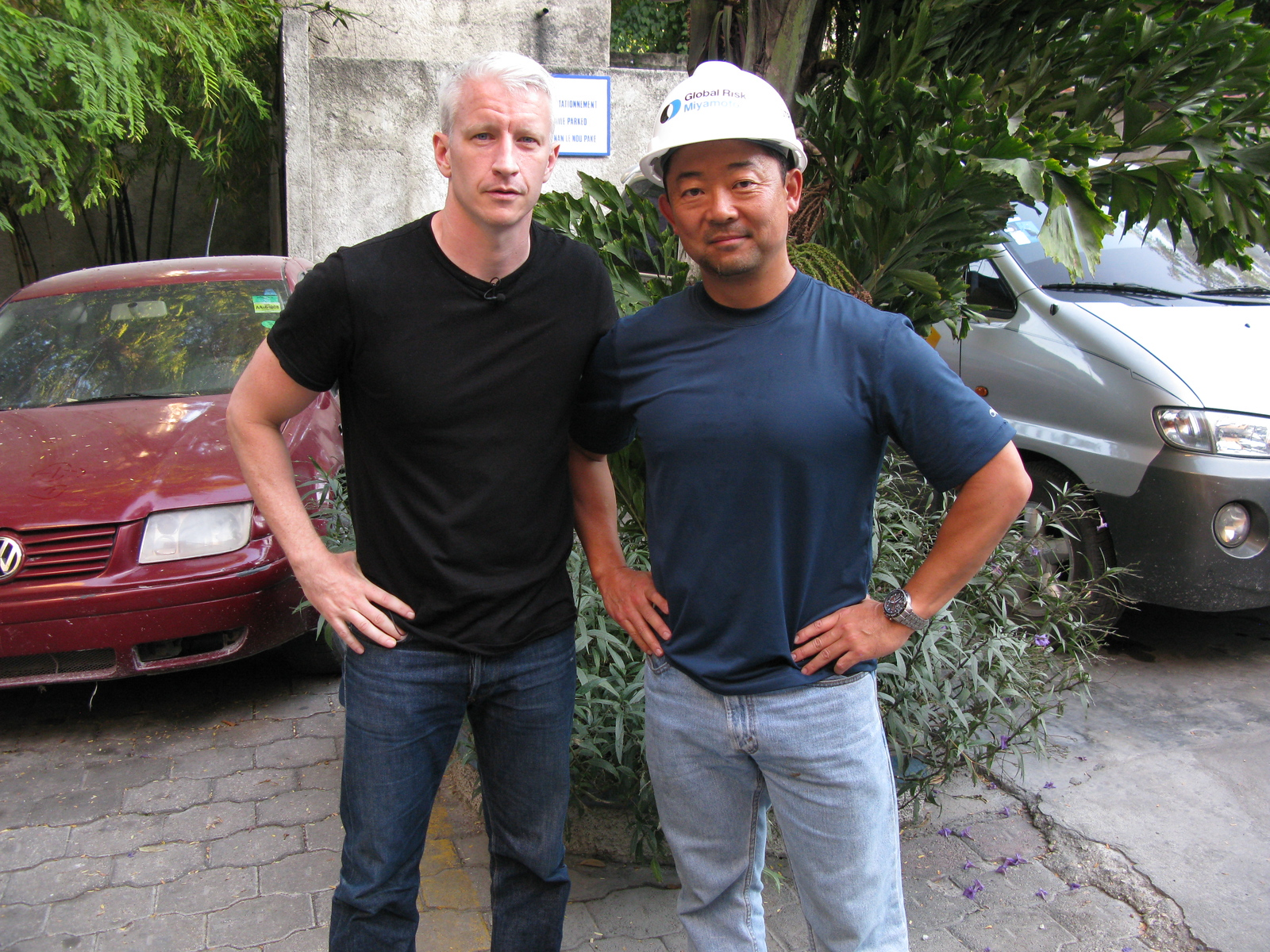
Miyamoto with journalist Anderson Cooper

Miyamoto was elected as a chair of the California Seismic Safety Commission in October 2020. He has formerly served as a seismic safety commissioner for eight years where he has advocated for increased resiliency in California.

== Innovations ==
Dr. Miyamoto was responsible for the seismic retrofit of the Theme Building, an iconic Space Age structure at Los Angeles International Airport (LAX). The innovative retrofit consisted of adding a tuned mass damper (TMD) to the top of the building's core. The TMD option was selected because it was less expensive, protected the building's architectural features, and minimized building closure. This was the first time this retrofit had been achieved in the United States.

== Awards and recognitions ==
Year	Award	Institution or Publication	Distinction
2024	Award of Excellence	Engineering News Record	Recognition of trajectory in engineering, disaster risk reduction, and post-disaster and post-conflict response across the globe.
2022	Most Admired CEO	Sacramento Business Journal	Honorees for this award program were nominated by Business Journal readers and staff and chosen through a vote of their peers.
2015	Humanitarian Award	American Society of Civil Engineers of Sacramento	The award is given annually to an outstanding Sacramento Section member who supports ASCE's mission through dedication of time and involvement with humanitarian efforts, local Section affairs, safety, social services, and the like.
2013	G. Brooks Earnest Technical Lecture Award	American Society of Civil Engineers	This Award lecture is presented by an outstanding individual of National and/or International prominence, preferably one who is renowned in the field of Civil Engineering.
2012	Allied Professions Honor Award	American Institute of Architects California Council	The award celebrates a member of an allied profession who is committed to enhancing and contributing to the field of architecture and architectural design.
2012	Distinguished Alumni	California State University, Sacramento	The Distinguished Service Award recognizes professional achievements and community service to alumni.
2011	Distinguished Alumni	California State University, Chico	The Distinguished Alumni Award honors alumni from California State University for their outstanding contributions to their communities.
2011	Alfred E. Alquist California Seismic Safety Commissioner	Seismic Safety Commission	The Seismic Safety Commission (SSC) investigates earthquakes, researches earthquake-related issues and reports, and recommends to the Governor and Legislature policies and programs needed to reduce earthquake risk.
2011	Community Service Award	Sacramento Asian Pacific Chamber of Commerce	

== Disaster response ==
Miyamoto works in earthquake damage assessment, building safety, capacity building, and reconstruction strategies to improve seismic resilience. His work focuses on failure mechanisms and improved construction practices to reduce future earthquake risks.

Seismic Event	Contributions	Outcomes and impact
Sichuan, China (M-8.0, 2008)	Observation and assessment of collapsed schools and other buildings, identifying issues with non-ductile concrete construction	Provided recommendations on improving construction practices and seismic safety of buildings
Port-au-Prince, Haiti (M-7.0, 2010)	Damage assessment and reconstruction planning	Assessed 430,000 buildings and developed a repair program for damaged structures; Trained over 600 local engineers and 6,000 masons in seismic-resistant construction techniques; Helped repair nearly 10,000 houses, impacting over 100,000 people
Tōhoku, Japan (M-9.0, 2011)	Damage assessment and tsunami impacts	Observed failures of seawalls and nuclear power plant cooling systems; Provided recommendations on improving tsunami resilience of coastal infrastructure
Gorkha District, Nepal (M-7.8, 2015)	Damage assessment in Kathmandu and remote villages	Evaluated safety of damaged buildings and provided repair recommendations; Advised on reconstruction strategies and seismic strengthening of structures
Manabí Province, Ecuador (M-7.8, 2016)	Damage assessment in affected coastal areas	Worked with local officials to evaluate building safety and develop reconstruction plans; Provided training to local engineers on post-earthquake assessment techniques
Paktika, Afghanistan (M-5.9, 2022)	Damage assessment to develop repair strategies for traditional mud brick buildings	Provided recommendations on improving earthquake resistance of vernacular construction techniques; Trained local engineers and masons on proper repair and reconstruction methods
Osmaniye and Gaziantep, Türkiye-Syria (M-7.8, 2023)	Damage assessment to heavily damaged areas, building collapses and failures	Evaluated reasons for widespread destruction, including poor construction quality and lack of code enforcement; Provided recommendations on improving building safety and reconstruction strategies

== Media ==
He was also featured in the “Designing for Disaster” exhibit at the National Building Museum.
