= UC Davis Medical Center =

Coordinates: 38.5549°N 121.4565°W

- University of California

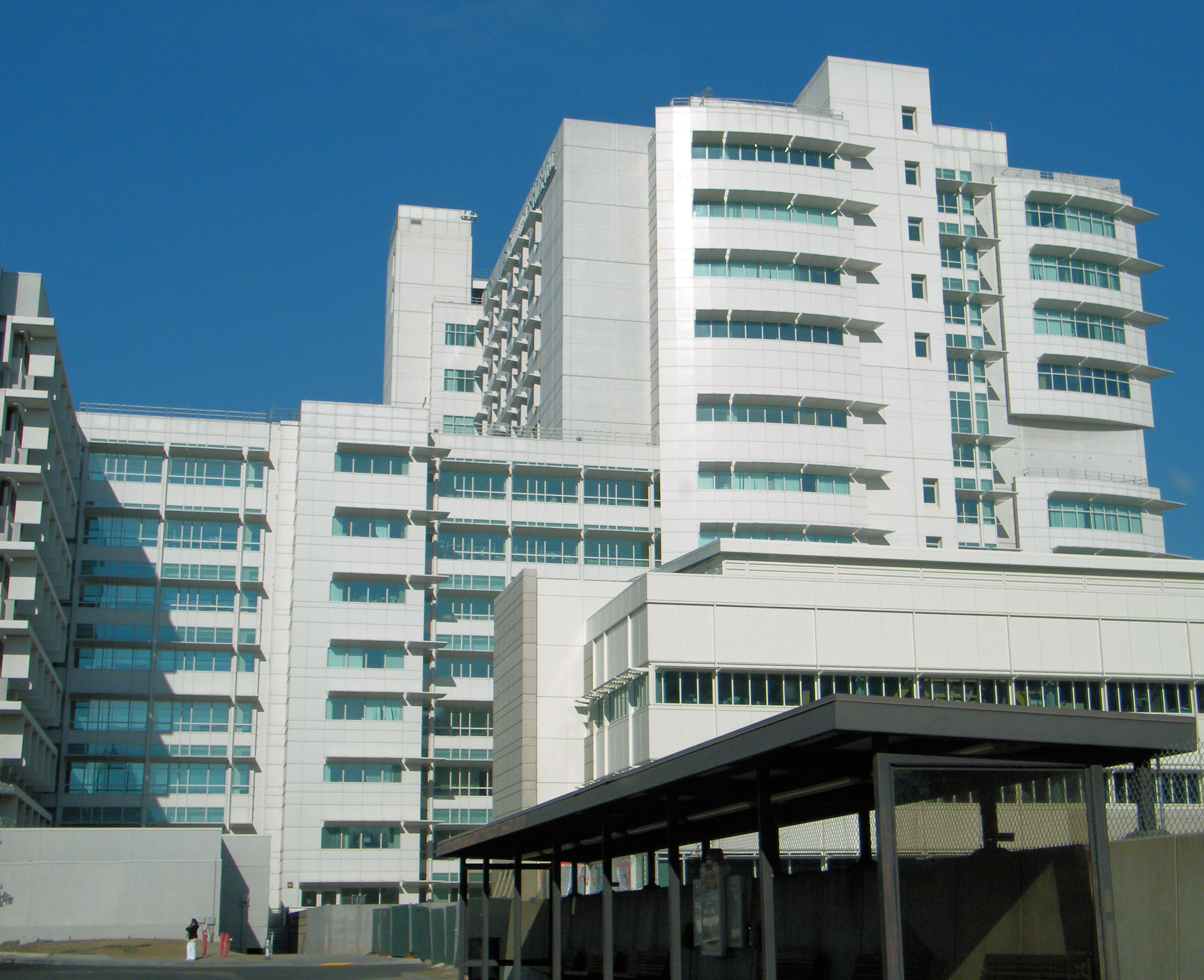

Geography
- Location: 2315 Stockton Blvd, Sacramento, California, United States

Organization
- Care system: Private, Medicaid, Medicare
- Type: Teaching
- Affiliated university: University of California, Davis

Services
- Emergency department: Level I Adult Trauma Center / Level I Pediatric Trauma Center
- Beds: 646

Helipads
- Helipad: (FAA LID: 3CL0)

History
- Founded: 1973 (purchased from County of Sacramento)

Links
- Website: health.ucdavis.edu/medicalcenter
- Lists: Hospitals in California

UC Davis Medical Center (UCDMC) is part of UC Davis Health and a major academic health center located in Sacramento, California. It is owned and operated by the University of California as part of its University of California, Davis campus. The medical center sits on a 142-acre (57 ha) campus (often referred to as the Sacramento Campus to distinguish it from the main campus in nearby Davis) located between the Elmhurst, Tahoe Park, and Oak Park residential neighborhoods. The site incorporates the land and some of the buildings of the former Sacramento Medical Center (which was acquired from the County of Sacramento in 1973) as well as much of the land (and two buildings) previously occupied by the California State Fair until its 1967 move to a new location.

The 646-bed hospital serves as key referral center for a 65,000-square-mile (170,000 km^{2}) area that includes 33 counties and 6 million residents. It operates inland Northern California's only level I trauma center for both adult and pediatric emergencies and maintains a staff of specialists and researchers in more than 150 areas of health care.

UC Davis Medical Center ranked among the nation's top hospitals for 2020–21 in 9 adult medical specialties and 4 children's medical specialties, and it is the 6th best hospital in California, according to an annual U.S. News & World Report Best Hospitals survey published in July 2020.

The medical center is the primary teaching hospital affiliated with the UC Davis School of Medicine. The hospital, medical school, Betty Irene Moore School of Nursing and UC Davis Medical Group together comprise UC Davis Health, a brand of the nearby University of California, Davis.

== History ==
The history of UC Davis Medical Center dates to May 3, 1850, when Sacramento City Council recommended that a hospital be built. The Sacramento County Hospital was established as a result, in 1852.

In 1871, the hospital was moved to a 22-acre (8.9 ha) parcel of land on Stockton Boulevard in Sacramento, California (the present location of UC Davis Medical Center). Just five years later, the original facility was destroyed by fire. In 1879, a new hospital was completed and accepted by the county. This facility was designed by N.D. Goodell, architect of the Governors Mansion in Sacramento. It stood until 1914, when construction of an entirely new facility was proposed. The main hospital building was completed in 1928, and still stands today. It was incorporated into the north–south wing of the main hospital in 1950.

In 1964, 34,000 square feet (3,200 m^{2}) of space was added to the hospital. Two years later, the facility became a community hospital, making everyone in Sacramento County eligible for patient care. In 1966, an affiliation agreement was reached with UC Davis, making the hospital a primary teaching hospital, and expanding its mission to include education and research. The Medical School at Davis opened its doors on September 23, 1968, and one month later a dedication ceremony changed the name of the hospital from Sacramento County Hospital to the Sacramento Medical Center.

In 1970, the defeat of a Health Sciences Bond issue squelched the hopes of a new V.A. hospital in Davis, California, setting in motion an agreement signed two years later between the County of Sacramento and UC Davis. This agreement provided for the transfer of ownership and operation of the hospital to the university. That same year, UC Regents purchased 32 acres (13 ha) of vacant land east of 45th Street, formerly used by the California State Fairgrounds. This purchase increased the size of the medical center campus to 54 acres (22 ha). The Sacramento Medical Center officially became the University of California, Davis Medical Center on July 1, 1978, five years after its purchase on July 1, 1973.

== Trauma and emergency care ==
=== Level I trauma center ===
UC Davis Medical Center is verified as both a level I trauma center and a level I pediatric trauma center by the American College of Surgeons. Of the 112 level I trauma centers in the United States, fewer than 20 are verified for both adults and pediatrics.

UC Davis functions as California's only level I trauma center north of San Francisco and is historically among the nation's busiest. In 2008, UC Davis admitted more than twice the number of trauma patients required to achieve level I status.

=== Burn Center ===
The UC Davis Burn Center collaborates with neighboring Shriners Hospitals for Children Northern California hospital to create a regional burn treatment center. As part of their collaboration, UC Davis Medical Center cares for adult burn patients and Shriners for children. With close to 600 admissions per year, the combined burn programs make up one of the busiest five to ten burn centers in the nation. Specialists also research and develop model treatments and guidelines for improving burn care and recovery.

The center is the only one in inland Northern California and the Central Valley verified by the American Burn Association. The review program is designed to verify a burn center's resources that are required for the provision of optimal care to burn patients from the time of injury through rehabilitation. Of 125 hospitals with burn centers in the United States, fewer than half are verified.

Community firefighters partnered with UC Davis in 1972 to establish the UC Davis Regional Burn Center after an airplane crash at a Sacramento ice cream parlor killed 22 people and severely burned dozens. In 2005 the Firefighters Burn Institute donated $1 million to help build a new, larger center that will consolidate services in a single location.

=== Advanced primary stroke center ===
UC Davis Medical Center is certified as an advanced primary stroke center by The Joint Commission, signifying that services have the critical elements to achieve long-term success in improving outcomes for stroke patients. Certification is based on recommendations from the Brain Attack Coalition, and the American Stroke Association.

== Specialty centers ==
As part of UC Davis Health, UC Davis Medical Center is closely linked to clinical and research centers in several areas of advanced medicine.

=== Cancer Center ===
The UC Davis Comprehensive Cancer Center is one of two cancer centers in Northern California designated by the federal government's National Cancer Institute for its ability to contribute to the nation's cancer research and serve as a major source of new knowledge on cancer treatment, diagnosis and prevention. UC Davis is also one of only 41 U.S. cancer centers to have earned the NCI's prestigious “comprehensive” designation, reserved for fewer than 1 percent of cancer centers nationwide. The center offers patients access to more than 150 clinical trials at any given time through a research program that includes more than 280 scientists. It was the first major cancer center to establish a formal research partnership with a national laboratory.

=== Vascular Center ===
The UC Davis Vascular Center provides care for patients with atherosclerosis or "hardening of the arteries" and other vascular problems, such as aneurysms, vein disorders and less common vascular conditions. A major emphasis is coordinating care among the multiple physicians who typically provide some aspect of care for patients with atherosclerosis. Participating specialties include vascular and cardiothoracic surgery, cardiology, interventional radiology, endocrinology and nephrology. UC Davis vascular surgeons have hosted live-case demonstrations for thousands of colleagues at national and international conferences.

=== MIND Institute ===
UC Davis MIND Institute scientists research treatments, causes and cures for autism, attention deficit hyperactivity disorder, fragile X syndrome, Tourette syndrome and other neurodevelopmental disorders. The center has a staff of more than 250 and is home to, or a major participant in, several major autism studies that are among the first or largest of their kind.

=== Institute for Regenerative Cures ===
Nearly 150 scientists work on stem cell-related research projects for UC Davis in Davis and Sacramento. The UC Davis Stem Cell Program is near the top of the list of institutions funded by the California Institute for Regenerative Medicine (CIRM), the state's stem cell agency.

The UC Davis Institute for Regenerative Cures includes Northern California's largest academic Good Manufacturing Practice laboratory, a federally certified facility that allows researchers to conduct clinical trials with patients. UC Davis researchers have treated four patients with adult stem cells to repair tissues damaged by heart attacks, and are working toward clinical trials to explore potential treatments for Huntington's disease, vision impairment and peripheral vascular disease.

=== Children's Hospital ===
UC Davis Children’s Hospital serves infants, children and adolescents with primary, subspecialty and critical-care. The 129-bed children's hospital includes more than 120 physicians in more than 30 subspecialties, a 49-bed neonatal intensive care unit and a 24-bed pediatric intensive care unit. The children's hospital has more than 74,000 clinic/hospital visits and 13,000 emergency department visits each year.

UC Davis Children's Hospital ranked among the nation's top hospitals for 2016–17 in five pediatric specialties in the annual U.S. News & World Report Best Hospitals survey published in June 2016.

=== Center for Simulation and Education Enhancement ===
The UC Davis Health Center for Simulation and Education Enhancement is a state-of-the-art health care simulation center focused on interprofessional medical education and research activities. Since its humble beginnings on the first floor of the UC Davis Medical Center, the simulation center has grown to include more than 10,000 square feet of dedicated simulation space on the third floor of the UC Davis Center for Health and Technology. In addition to patient simulators with advanced lifelike physiology, the center features a trauma bay, operating room, inpatient unit, six-bay patient ward area, task training room, technology enhanced classrooms and standardized patient exam rooms. It's accredited as a Comprehensive Education Institute by the American College of Surgeons.

== Telehealth and Video Visits ==
UC Davis Health uses telehealth and video visits to provide direct clinical care to patients at a distance, giving clinics and hospitals throughout the state access to more than 40 medical specialties not readily available in most smaller, rural communities. Since it was established in 1992, UC Davis Health's telehealth program has conducted more than 45,000 provider-to-provider telehealth consultations. The number of video visits between providers and patients for everything from primary care issues to specialty care concerns surged during the coronavirus pandemic of 2020 from an average of 20 video visits a day to nearly 1,100 a day.

In 2000, UC Davis executive leadership approved the creation of the Center for Health and Technology as a formal center with a broader mission around clinical service, research and development, industry relations, and education. The center's role further expanded in 2004 as a resource for the State of California when it received a biodefense training and preparedness contract for the state focused on the use of telehealth and related technologies. The center is the UC Davis Health hub for all things telehealth.

On Christmas morning 2008, a UC Davis Health specialist helped save the life of a boy in a Colusa hospital using telehealth technology from his own living room, 75 miles (121 km) away.

In October 2019, the UC Davis FamilyLink program expanded to include all 49 beds in the Neonatal Intensive Care Unit (NICU). The program allows authorized family members to virtually visit with their hospitalized baby 24/7 through a secure webcam connection when they are not physically able to be at the bedside. The program began in 2014.

In May 2020, UC Davis Health launched a Virtual Visit Program to help coronavirus patients and others connect with family members and care teams through a secure internet connection. This helped decrease exposure to the virus and provided patients with a valuable connection to their family members, who were unable to visit them due to COVID-19 restrictions.

UC Davis Health helps manage the Federal Communications Commission-funded California Telehealth Network, which provides broadband connections linking hundreds of primary-care sites, tribal clinics, rural hospitals and teaching hospitals.

The health system also helped build a 52,000-square-foot (4,800 m^{2}) California Telehealth Resource Center to act as a hub for education, training, and clinical care through technology-enabled consultation rooms. The center is financed through Proposition 1D funding, which California voters approved in 2006.

== Growth and expansion ==
Completed in 2010, UC Davis Medical Center's Surgery and Emergency Services Pavilion project added 472,000-square-feet (43,900 m^{2}) for surgery, trauma, emergency and burn services, including a new emergency department, new operating rooms, a neurosurgical intensive-care unit, cardiology services, pathology laboratory support, radiology services, a 12-bed burn unit and a new cafeteria.

The pavilion meets a combined need to comply with state seismic safety standards and to add more space and beds for programs currently in undersized, inadequate facilities. Senate Bill 1953 requires all California acute-care hospitals to meet new seismic safety standards. The medical center must also accommodate an increasing demand for inpatient services through additional beds and operating rooms. On occasion, the hospital has been forced to turn away all but the most seriously ill and injured patients because it is full.

== Human research scandal ==
In 2012, it was revealed that two doctors had performed untested medical treatments, amounting to "serious and continuing noncompliance" with federal regulations. Federal Centers for Medicare and Medicaid Services investigators released a report criticizing the hospital for its failures. The federal regulators went so far as to write that the hospital "lacks the capacity to render adequate care to patients."
