= Killer sudoku =

Arithmetical puzzle game

Example of a Killer Sudoku problem

Solution to the example above

The same example problem, as it would be printed in black and white

Killer sudoku (also killer su doku, sumdoku, sum doku, sumoku, addoku, or samunanpure サムナンプレ sum-num(ber) pla(ce)) is a puzzle based on sudoku with elements from kakuro. Like other sudoku variations, it is essentially a logic puzzle, but the solution also requires a certain amount of arithmetic.

== History ==
The invention of killer sudoku is usually credited to the Tokyo-based puzzle setter Tetsuya Nishio, who developed the puzzle from an original idea of one of his students, Miyuki Nisawa. It first appeared outside Japan in The Times in 2005, and now appears regularly in The Times and other publications.

In Japan the puzzle is known as samunamupure, which translates as "sum number place".

== Description ==
As in the standard sudoku puzzle, killer sudoku is based on a grid, consisting of nine rows, nine columns and nine 3×3 blocks. Unlike in the standard puzzle, the grid is initially empty, that is, no "starter" digits are shown. Individual cells within the grid are grouped into "cages", a cage consisting of between two and nine adjacent cells, not necessarily all in the same region (in this context, the term "region" refers to any row, column or 3×3 block). Cages are typically distinguished by their colors (with adjacent cages shown in different colors) or are delimited by a thin dotted or dashed line.

As in the standard puzzle, the goal is to fill the grid with digits from one to nine, such that each region contains exactly one of each of the digits. In addition, the digits within each cage must sum to a stated value, this being displayed in a corner of the cage. As an additional constraint, no digit may appear more than once within a cage (this rule was not always explicitly stated in early instances of the puzzle).

== Solving strategy ==
In a typical puzzle, several of the cages within the grid will hold a unique combination of digits. For example, a 2-cell cage with a sum of 4 can only contain 1 and 3. Similarly, a 3-cell cage with a sum of 24 must contain 7, 8, and 9. Identifying such cages will often give the solver a starting point towards the solution.

By definition, within each region, the values of the cells always sum to 45 (1+2+ ... +9). If all the cages within a given region lie completely within that region except for a single cell, then the value of that cell (which is called an "innie") is equal to 45 minus the sum of the other cages in the region. Conversely, if there is a single cell that lies outside the region (this is called an "outie"), its value is the sum of the other cages in the region minus 45.

Going further, the cells in two adjacent regions always sum to 90. If the puzzle contains two adjacent regions, neither of which has an innie, but where the combined regions do have an innie, the value of that innie can be determined by subtracting the sum of the cages in both regions from 90; and conversely, if the combined regions contain an outie, its value is equal to 90 minus the sum of the cages. This stratagem can be further extended to three adjacent regions (the sum of which is 135) and so on.

As the solution develops, the standard sudoku rules can be applied. In particular, the fact that a given digit can only appear once in a given region can often be used to eliminate digits from cells that otherwise contain several possible digits.

== Variations ==
In Killer Sudoku-X, the same rules apply but with the additional requirement that no cell value may appear more than once in either of the grid's long diagonals. This variation is sometimes known as Sumdoku-X, Mathdoku-X or Addoku-X.

Killer Jigsaw Sudoku also follows the rules of the standard killer puzzle, but the 3×3 blocks are replaced by irregularly shaped regions. Each of these regions has the same number of cells, but they are not all necessarily the same shape.

== See also ==
- Kakuro
- Sudoku
- KenKen
