= KenKen =

Logic-based number-placement puzzle

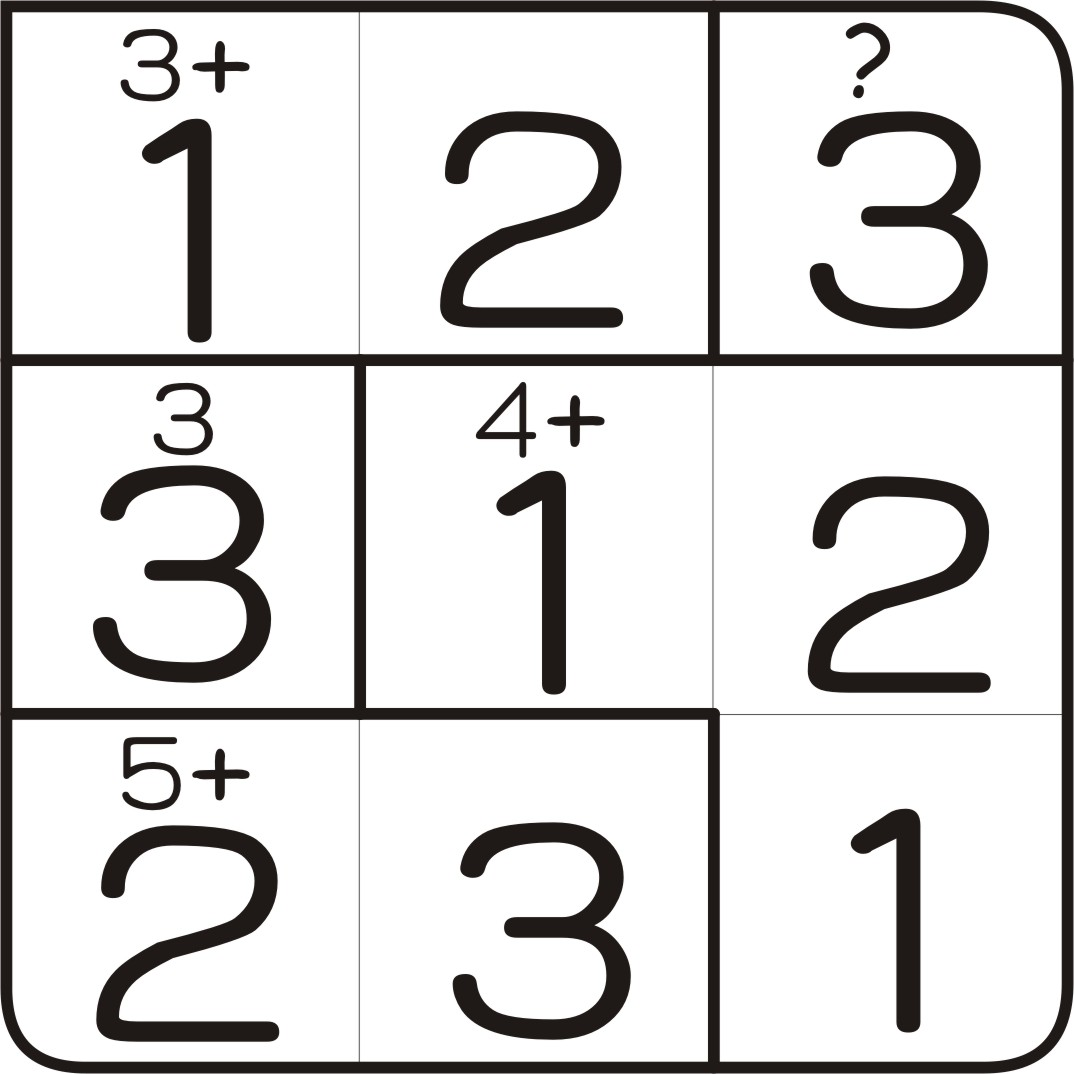
A simple KenKen puzzle, with answers filled in as large numbers.

KenKen and KenDoku are trademarked names for a style of arithmetic and logic puzzle invented in 2004 by Japanese math teacher Tetsuya Miyamoto, who intended the puzzles to be an instruction-free method of training the brain. The name derives from the Japanese word for cleverness (賢, ken, kashiko(i)). The names Calcudoku and Mathdoku are sometimes used by those who do not have the rights to use the KenKen or KenDoku trademarks.

== General rules ==
As in Sudoku, the goal of each puzzle is to fill a grid with digits –– 1 through 4 for a 4×4 grid, 1 through 5 for a 5×5, 1 through 6 for a 6×6, etc. –– so that no digit appears more than once in any row or any column (a Latin square). Grids range in size from 3×3 to 9×9. Additionally, KenKen grids are divided into heavily outlined groups of cells –– often called “cages” –– and the numbers in the cells of each cage must produce a certain “target” number when combined using a specified mathematical operation (one of addition, subtraction, multiplication or division). For example, a linear three-cell cage specifying addition and a target number of 6 in a 4×4 puzzle must be satisfied with the digits 1, 2, and 3. Digits may be repeated within a cage, as long as they are not in the same row or column. No operation is relevant for a single-cell cage: placing the "target" in the cell is the only possibility (thus being a "free space"). The target number and operation appear in the upper left-hand corner of the cage.

In the English-language KenKen books of Will Shortz, the issue of the non-associativity of division and subtraction is addressed by restricting clues based on either of those operations to cages of only two cells in which the numbers may appear in any order. Hence if the target is 1 and the operation is - (subtraction) and the number choices are 2 and 3, possible answers are 2,3 or 3,2. Some puzzle authors have not done this and have published puzzles that use more than two cells for these operations.

== History ==
In 2007, toy inventor Robert Fuhrer, owner of Nextoy and creator of Gator Golf, Crocodile Dentist, and dozens of other popular toys and games, encountered KenKen books published in Japan by the educational publisher Gakken Co., Ltd. and titled "Kashikoku naru Puzzle" (賢くなるパズル, Kashikoku naru pazuru; lit. "to become smart puzzle"). Fuhrer's company Nextoy, LLC (now holder of a trademark on "KenKen" and "KenDoku" as a name for brain-training puzzles) and chess International Master David Levy helped bring the puzzles to the attention of Michael Harvey, an editor of The Times (London). Harvey, impressed with what he calls its "depth and magnitude", arranged for publication of such puzzles, starting in March 2008, in The Times. Other papers, including the New York Times, followed suit. KenKen now appears in more than 200 newspapers in the United States and worldwide. In 2014, KenKen signed an agreement with DTI, the software division of inflight entertainment expert Advanced Flight Alliance AG, and its parent company Global Eagle Entertainment, to provide KenKen on international flights. In 2015, KenKen partnered with German news organization Der Spiegel. The magazine, which is one of Europe's largest news publications, offers KenKen puzzles on their mobile app. KenKen is also being used by over 30,000 teachers throughout the United States to teach math skills, problem solving techniques, logic, and critical thinking. Today KenKen can be played online at www.kenkenpuzzle.com, as well as on its iOS, Android and Kindle Fire apps.

== Example ==
A typical KenKen problem.

Solution to the above problem.

The objective is to fill the grid in with the digits 1 through 6 so that:

- Each row contains exactly one of each digit
- Each column contains exactly one of each digit
- Each bold-outlined group of cells is a cage containing digits which achieve the specified result using the specified mathematical operation: addition (+), subtraction (−), multiplication (×), and division (÷). (Unlike Killer Sudoku, digits may repeat within a cage.)

Some of the techniques from Sudoku and Killer Sudoku can be used here, but much of the process involves the listing of all the possible options and eliminating the options one by one as other information requires.

In the example here:

(sets of numbers such as "5,6" and "4,5" could appear in any order)

- "11+" in the leftmost column can only be "5,6"
- "2÷" in the top row must be one of "1,2", "2,4" or "3,6"
- "20×" in the fourth column must be "4,5".
- "6×" in the top right must be "1,1,2,3". Therefore, the two "1"s must be in separate columns, thus row 1 column 5 is a "1".
- "30x" in the fourth row down must contain "5,6"
- "240×" on the left side is one of "6,5,4,2" or "3,5,4,4". Either way the five must be in the upper right cell because we have "5,6" already in column 1, and "5,6" in row 4. Also, then the combination must be "3,5,4,4" because there is nowhere to put the 6, with the above criteria.

== Extensions ==
More complex KenKen problems are formed using the principles described above but omitting the symbols +, −, × and ÷, thus leaving them as yet another unknown to be determined. Other authors of puzzles include more complex operations, including exponentiation, modulus, and bit-wise operations. Ranges of values can be varied, such as including zero, or having negative values (e.g., -2 to +2 in a 5-by-5 square).

== Education ==
One of KenKen's main uses is in the classroom as a means of teaching basic arithmetic and logic skills. In 2009, KenKen LLC began the KenKen Classroom (KKCR) Program, which allowed teachers to subscribe to a weekly newsletter providing KenKen puzzle sets, as well as other brain teasers, and KenKen news. Today, over 25,000 educators are a part of the KKCR Program. In addition to KKCR, KenKen also helps educators organize their own KenKen clubs and tournaments in their schools. KenKen partners with educators to help students learn while having fun. KenKen has collaborated with the National Council of Teachers of Mathematics (NCTM), to create a mobile app in order to help students develop their math and logic skills. KenKen is featured on Scholastic Corporation's online sites Scholastic Math and Scholastic Dynamath, as well as on The Math Forum @ Drexel.

== Tournaments ==
Beginning in 2010, KenKen CEO Robert Fuhrer has organized yearly KenKen tournaments held at the Chappaqua Library in Chappaqua, New York. Tournaments are open to all ages and skill levels. In addition to the Chappaqua tournament in December, Fuhrer partnered with IBM to host an international tournament in May 2015. In 2016, five students in India, Gaurav Pandey, Neharika Rajesh, Visharad Srivastava, Devika Pillai and Kajal Agarwal, beat 75,000 competitors to secure a place in the International Round that was held in New York on 18th Dec 2016. In addition to the visitors, many local students ages 8–18 competed in the tournament. The tournament was won by eight-year-old Gaurav Pandey, who beat out competitors up to twice his age. In 2016, the United Arab Emirates also took part in KenKen International Championship, with over 6000 students from more than 60 schools participating. Of those, eight of the top ranking students from the UAE 2016 finals represented the country in the International Level round in New York City on December 18: Eeshan Sharma from GEMS Modern Academy; Ganesh Ramm from The Oxford School, Dubai; Helem Jos from Sunrise English Private School; Mythri Muralikannan from The Millennium School Dubai; Paarth Gupta from GEMS Dubai American Academy; Aryaman Chawla from Dubai College; Gamin Kwon from The English College; and Ghaia Aljarwan from Rosary School.

In December 2016, the KenKen International Championship was held in New York City. Winners were John Gilling, Ellie Grueskin and Molly Olonoff. In December 2017, the KenKen International Championship was held in Pleasantville, N.Y. Winners were John Gilling, Ellie Grueskin and Mike Holman.

Year	1st place	2nd place	3rd place
2010	Molly Olonoff	Rebecca Shapiro	Martin Eiger
2011	Molly Olonoff	Martin Eiger	Adam Marcus
2012	Martin Eiger	Adam Marcus	Molly Olonoff
2013	Martin Eiger	Matthew Zander	Daniel Gritz
2014	Mack Meller	Martin Eiger	Hobart Chin
2015 (International)	Gaurav Pandey	Devika Pillai	Ellie Grueskin
2015	Martin Eiger	John Gilling	Daniel Wolkowitz
2016 (West Coast)	Michael Dunn	Ross Frischmuth	Matthew Zander
2016 (International)	John Gilling	Ellie Grueskin	Molly Olonoff
2017 (International)	John Gilling	Ellie Grueskin	Tess Mandell
2018 (International)	John Gilling	Martin Eiger	Julie Davis

Over the past several years KenKen has expanded internationally and now runs national tournaments in multiple countries for students. There are three age groups and the student winners of each division attend the KenKen International Championship in New York. Student divisions include Sigma (Approximate age is 14 and up), Kappa (Approximate age 11–14), and Delta (Approximate age 11 and younger). There is also an adult division and a senior division for those over the age of 60.

Year	Division	1st place	2nd place	3rd place	4th place	5th place
2016	Adult	John Gilling	Jed Silver	Molly Olonoff	Martin Eiger	Matthew Zander
2016	Sigma	Ellie Grueskin	Gamin Kwon	Varun Gupta	Viraj Kathuria	Tessa Wayne
2016	Kappa	Aryaman Chawla	Noah Tirschwell	Devika Pillai	Gaurav Pandey	Mythri Muralikannan
2016	Delta	P. Ganesh Ramm	Visharad Srivastava	Neharika Rajesh	Zeno Lenz	Alexia Kemmerich
2017	Adult	John Gilling	Michael Holman	Tess Mandell	John Longmire	Michael Dunn
2017	Senior	Debra Kuyatt	Scott Rubinow	Dan Jonas	Lawrence Schwartz	Bob Buderi
2017	Sigma	Ellie Grueskin	Gamin Kwon	Questin McQuilkin	Viraj Kathuria	Abigail Nelkin
2017	Kappa	Nakshatra Pratap	Sumer Moudgil	Ian Hueston	Ozzie Kelly-Yuoh	Noah Tirschwell
2017	Delta	Aritro Chatterjee	Eli Vennebush	Alex Vennebush and Rafi Wall	Kaavya Mishra	Andrew Xu
2018	Adult	John Gilling	Martin Eiger	Julie Davis	Ellie Grueskin	David Kramer
2018	Senior	Scott Rubinow	Elliot Landowne	Jordan Lagner	Peter DeFabritus	Eve Weingarten
2018	Sigma	Noah Tirschwell	Peter Dorovitsine	Nikash Kathuria	Tyler Jonas	Abigail Nelkin
2018	Kappa	Aritro Chatterjee	Abhinav Bhanupratap Singh	Om Ravindra Shintre	Eli Vennebush	Alex Vennebush
2018	Delta	Jeff John Sunil	Eeshan Sharma	Nola Bass-Weiss	Rishika Sood	Christopher James
2019	Adult					
2019	Senior					
2019	Sigma					
2019	Kappa					
2019	Delta					

== See also ==
- Sudoku
- Inshi no heya
