= Seizo Suzuki =

Japanese horticulturist (1913–2000)

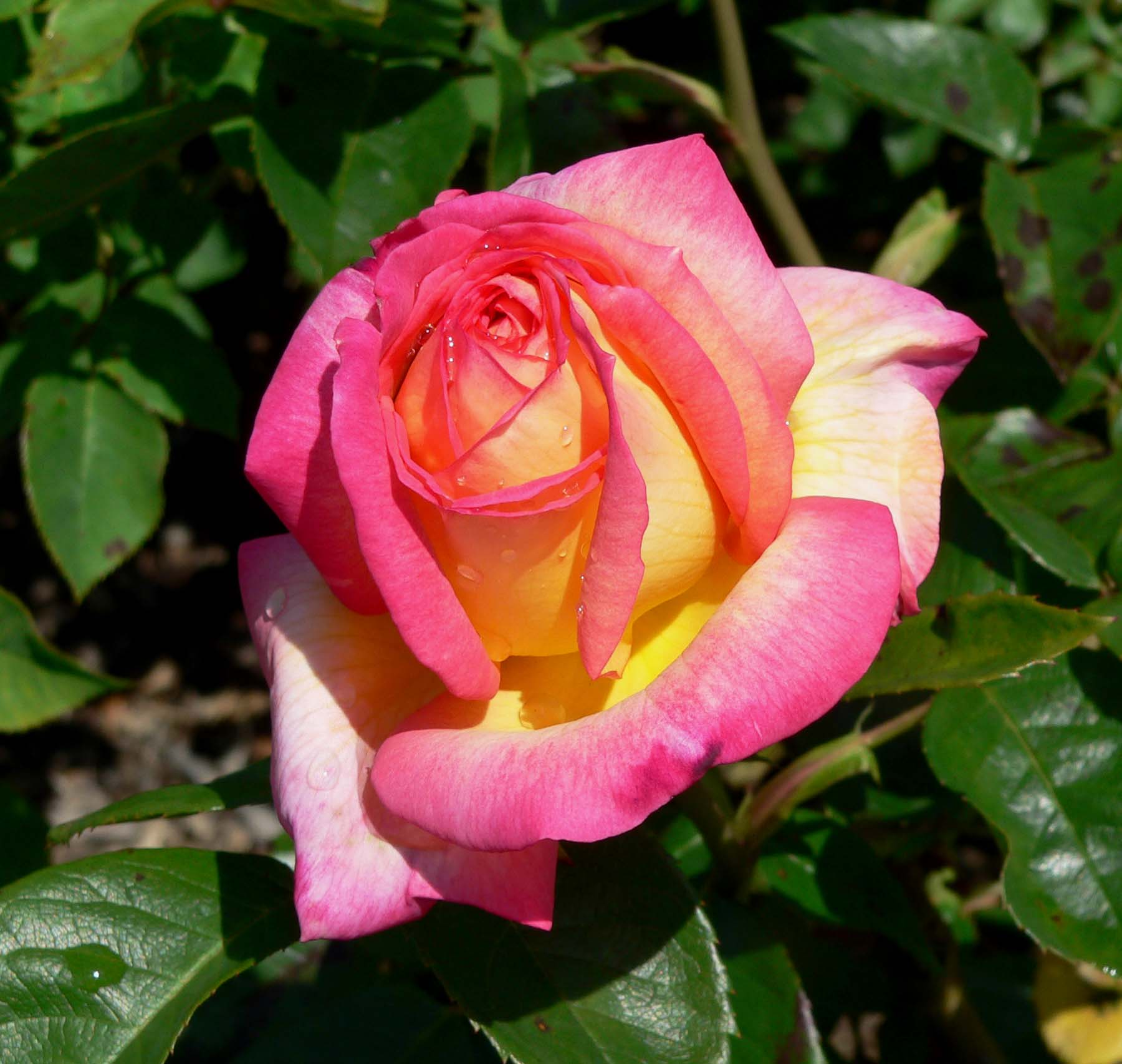
Rosa 'Asagumo' (Oriental Dawn), Suzuki 1973

Seizo Suzuki (鈴木 省三, Suzuki Seizō; 23 May 1913 – 20 January 2000) was a Japanese rose hybridizer and the director of the Keisei Rose Research Institute in Japan. He has been described as one of the leading modern Japanese rose breeders.

== Rose breeding career ==
Suzuki opened Todoroki Rose Garden in Tokyo in 1938. With the help of his wife Haruyo his collection of 300 rose varieties survived the Second World War, laying the foundation for his career as professional rosarian.

In 1956, Suzuki achieved his first international success, when his cultivar 'Amanogawa' ('The Milky Way'), a yellow floribunda, was awarded a bronze medal at the International Gardening Association Contest in Hamburg.

When the Keisei Rose Nursery was created in 1958, Suzuki was asked to lead its research institute. His most popular cultivars include French Perfume, Gipsy Carnival, Kuroshinju, Mikado and Olympic Torch (syn. 'Seika').

== Disambiguation ==
Avoid confusion with Seizo Suzuki (鈴木清三), classical musician (oboist) 1922-2008
