= Ro (video game) =

2006 video game

- RO
- Developer: Duael Designs LLC
- Publisher: Roamular LLC
- Designer: Robert Stein III, Angel Diaz
- Series: Ro
- Engine: Roamular LLC Framework
- Platform: iOS
- Genre: Puzzle game
- Mode: Single player

Ro is a puzzle game first developed for the Qualcomm Brew development platform in 2006 and for the iPhone platform in 2008.

== History ==
Ro was initially created as part of a larger unpublished FMV game titled, "Red Sky", which was proposed to Trilobyte Inc in 1996. It was intended to be a puzzle "Lock" mechanism for doors, safes, and other locking devices. "Rotating Off-Centers" was the working title of the game for several years, hence "RO" as a name.

Ro was designed with the casual gamer in mind, even before casual games became a genre. As it was originally intended to be part of a larger game, it needed to be challenging, yet simple enough to solve quickly, without destroying the larger gameplay. Ro for the iPhone has evolved to a game that can stand on its own, with Twenty (20) increasingly challenging levels.

== Gameplay ==
The objective of this game is to realign a scrambled image by rotating the rings. Each selected ring will rotate either 90 or 180 degrees. In doing so, the selected ring will cause neighboring rings to rotate as well. These neighboring rings will rotate at a different rate and direction as the selected ring. These differing rotation patterns change from puzzle to puzzle. The challenge is for the player to discover the pattern for each puzzle, and use it to solve the puzzle in the fewest moves.

== Influence ==
Ro, while an original design, is somewhat influenced by the traditional sliding puzzles. A greater influence is what's known as the "Parent Child" relationship in animation. The "Parent Child" relationship is what governs the rotational relationship between rings.
