= Sliding puzzle =

Puzzle game involving sliding pieces

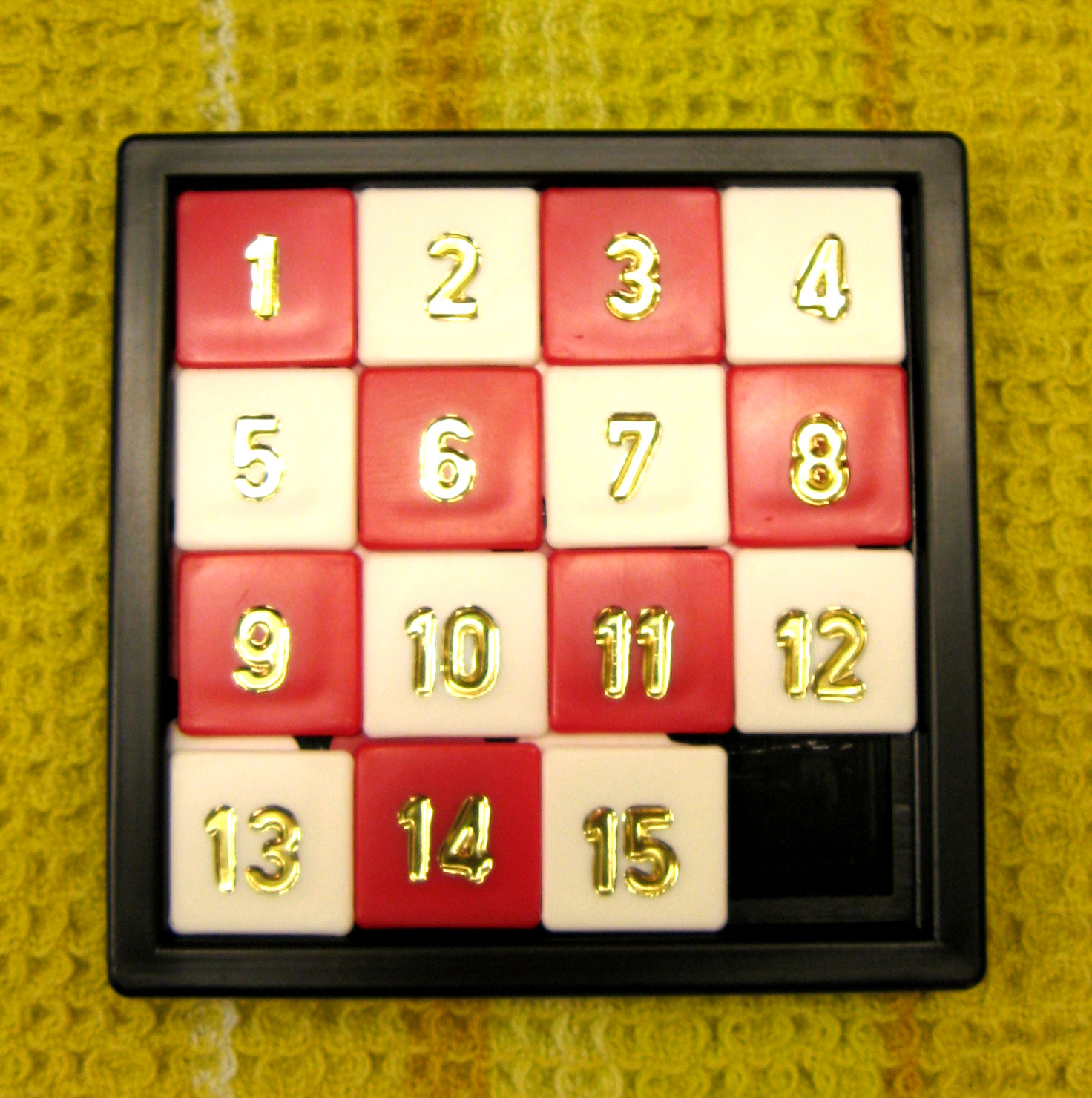
A sliding 15-puzzle

A sliding puzzle, sliding block puzzle, or sliding tile puzzle is a combination puzzle that challenges a player to slide (almost always flat) pieces along certain routes (usually on a board) to establish a certain end-configuration. The pieces to be moved may consist of simple shapes, or they may be imprinted with colours, patterns, sections of a larger picture (like a jigsaw puzzle), numbers, or letters.

Sliding puzzles are essentially two-dimensional in nature, even if the sliding is facilitated by mechanically interlinked pieces (like partially encaged marbles) or three-dimensional tokens. In manufactured wood and plastic products, the linking and encaging is often achieved in combination, through mortise-and-tenon key channels along the edges of the pieces. In at least one vintage case of the popular Chinese cognate game Huarong Road, a wire screen prevents lifting of the pieces, which remain loose. As the illustration shows, some sliding puzzles are mechanical puzzles. However, the mechanical fixtures are usually not essential to these puzzles; the parts could as well be tokens on a flat board that are moved according to certain rules.

Unlike tour puzzles, a sliding block puzzle prohibits lifting any pieces off the board. This property separates sliding puzzles from rearrangement puzzles. Hence, finding moves and the paths opened up by each move within the two-dimensional confines of the board are important parts of solving sliding block puzzles.

The oldest type of sliding puzzle is the fifteen puzzle, invented by Noyes Chapman in 1880; Sam Loyd is often wrongly credited with making sliding puzzles popular based on his false claim that he invented the fifteen puzzle. Chapman's invention initiated a puzzle craze in the early 1880s. From the 1950s through the 1980s, sliding puzzles employing letters to form words were very popular. These sorts of puzzles have several possible solutions, as may be seen from examples such as Ro-Let (a letter-based fifteen puzzle), Scribe-o (4×8), and Lingo.

The fifteen puzzle has been computerized (as puzzle video games) and examples are available to play for free online from many Web pages. It is a descendant of the jigsaw puzzle in that its point is to form a picture on-screen. The last square of the puzzle is then displayed automatically once the other pieces have been lined up. The game's latest evolution involved arranging moving animations or video pieces instead of static images. This became possible thanks to increased computing power.

== Group theory ==
As a famous example of the sliding puzzle, it can be proved that the 15 puzzle can be represented by the alternating group $A_{15}$, because the combinations of the 15 puzzle can be generated by 3-cycles. In fact, any $n \times m$ sliding puzzle with square tiles of equal size can be represented by $A_{n m - 1}$.

== Gallery ==
A solved 15-puzzle

A solved 15-puzzle with letters forming a sentence

A solved 15-puzzle with an image

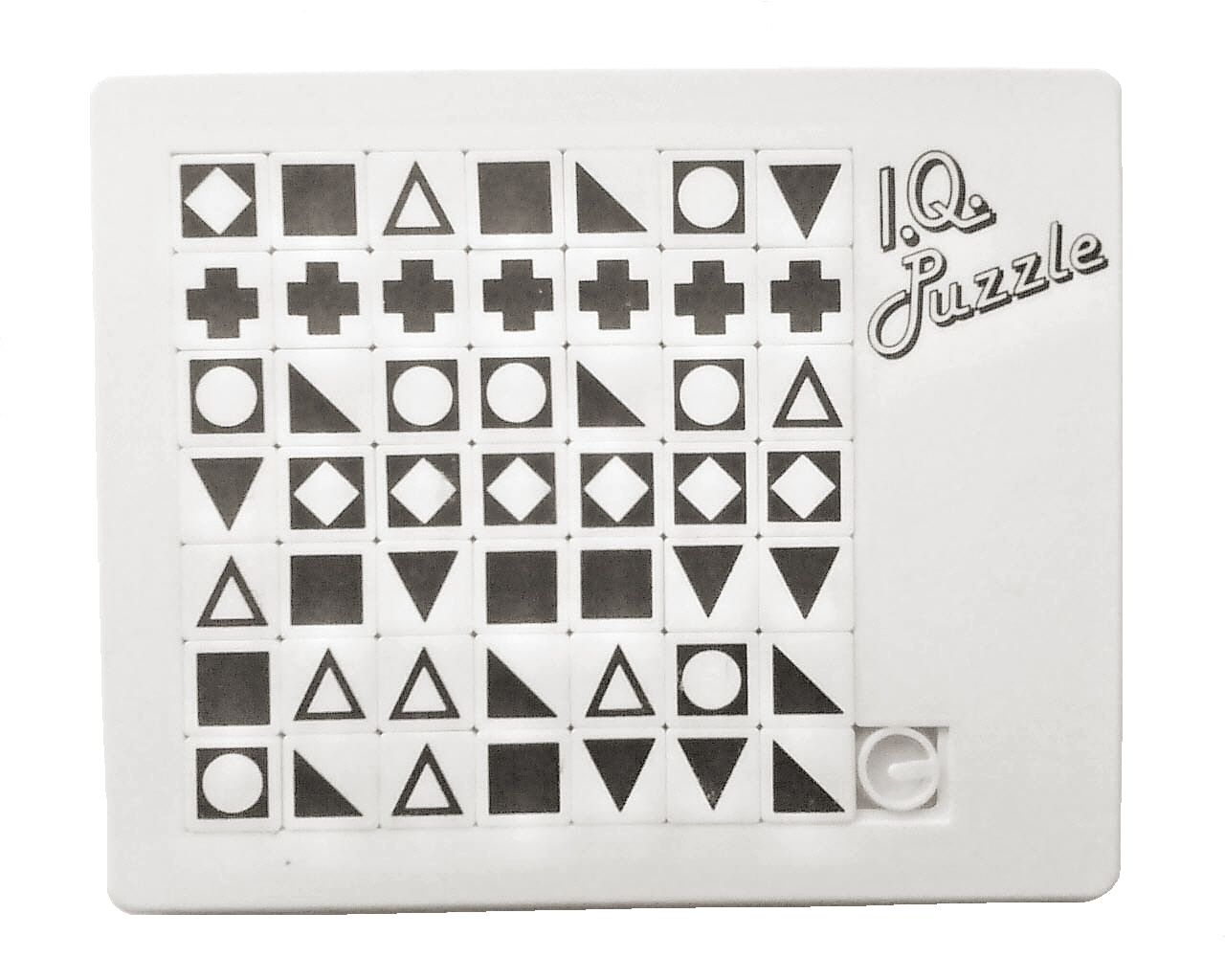
A 7×7 sliding puzzle. The goal is for each image to appear only once horizontally, vertically, and diagonally. There is more than one solution to this puzzle.

A 3×3 sliding puzzle featuring a comic book character

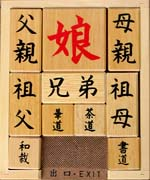
An example of the Klotski puzzle

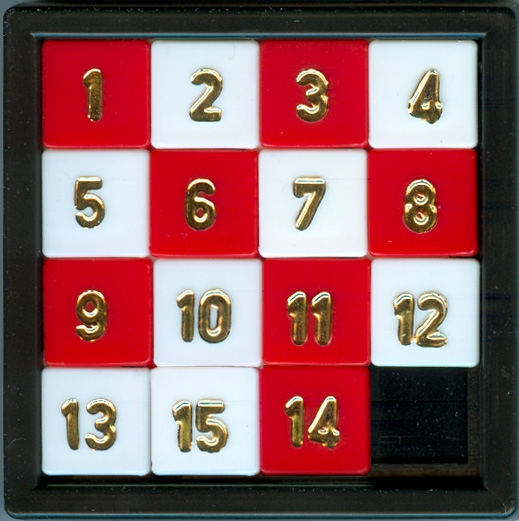
An unsolvable puzzle due to the pieces not being in an even permutation

== Examples of sliding puzzles ==
- 15 puzzle
- Klotski
- Minus Cube
- Rubik's Slide
- Rush Hour
- Sokoban

== See also ==
- Ro (video game) – A rotational variation
- Rubik's Cube
