= Rubik's Slide =

Electronic puzzle game

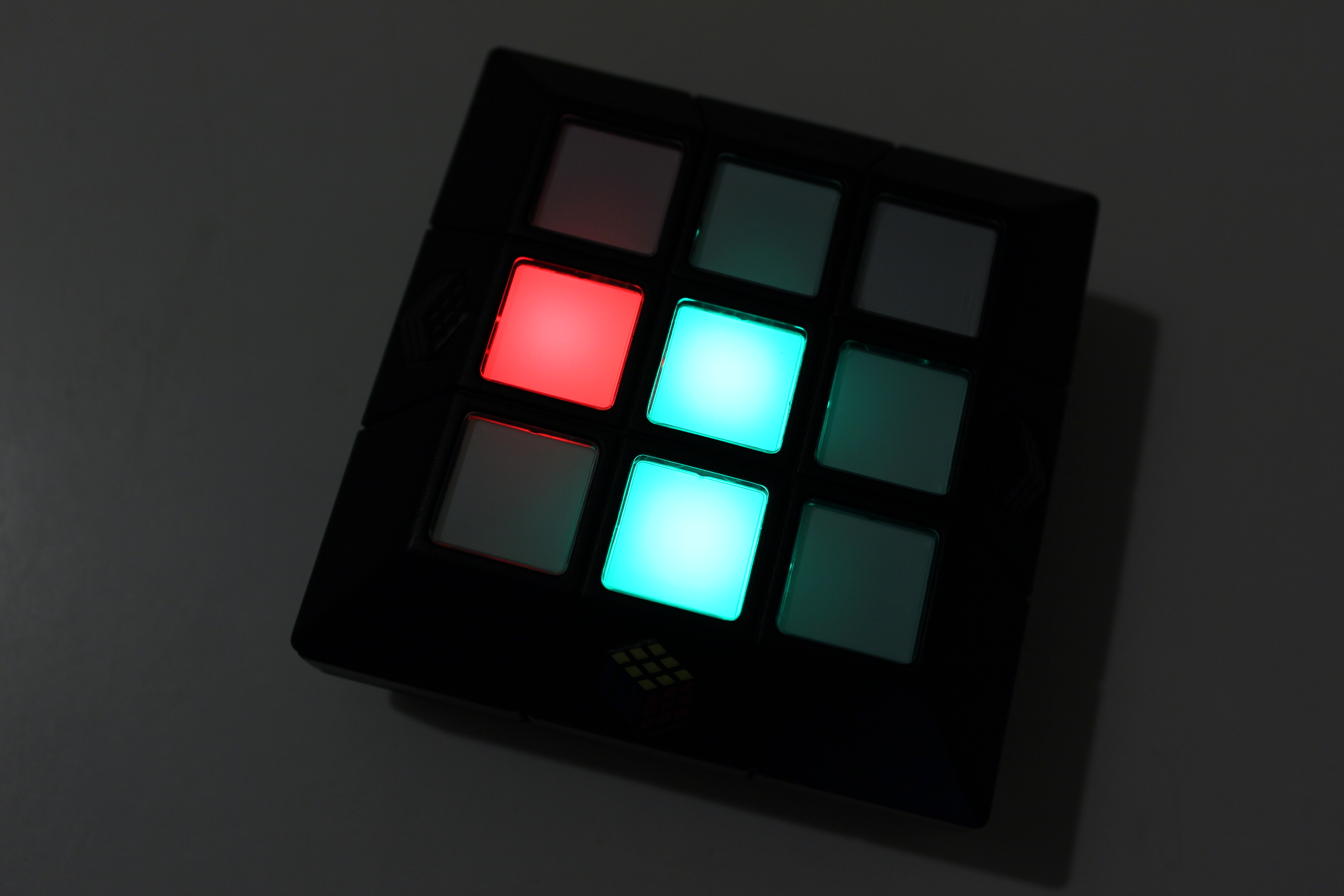
A Rubik's Slide puzzle

Rubik's Slide electronic puzzle game is a Rubik's-branded combination puzzle produced by TechnoSource in 2010. Players must manipulate the circuit to re-create a specified pattern, with 10,000 puzzles built into the device.

== Description ==
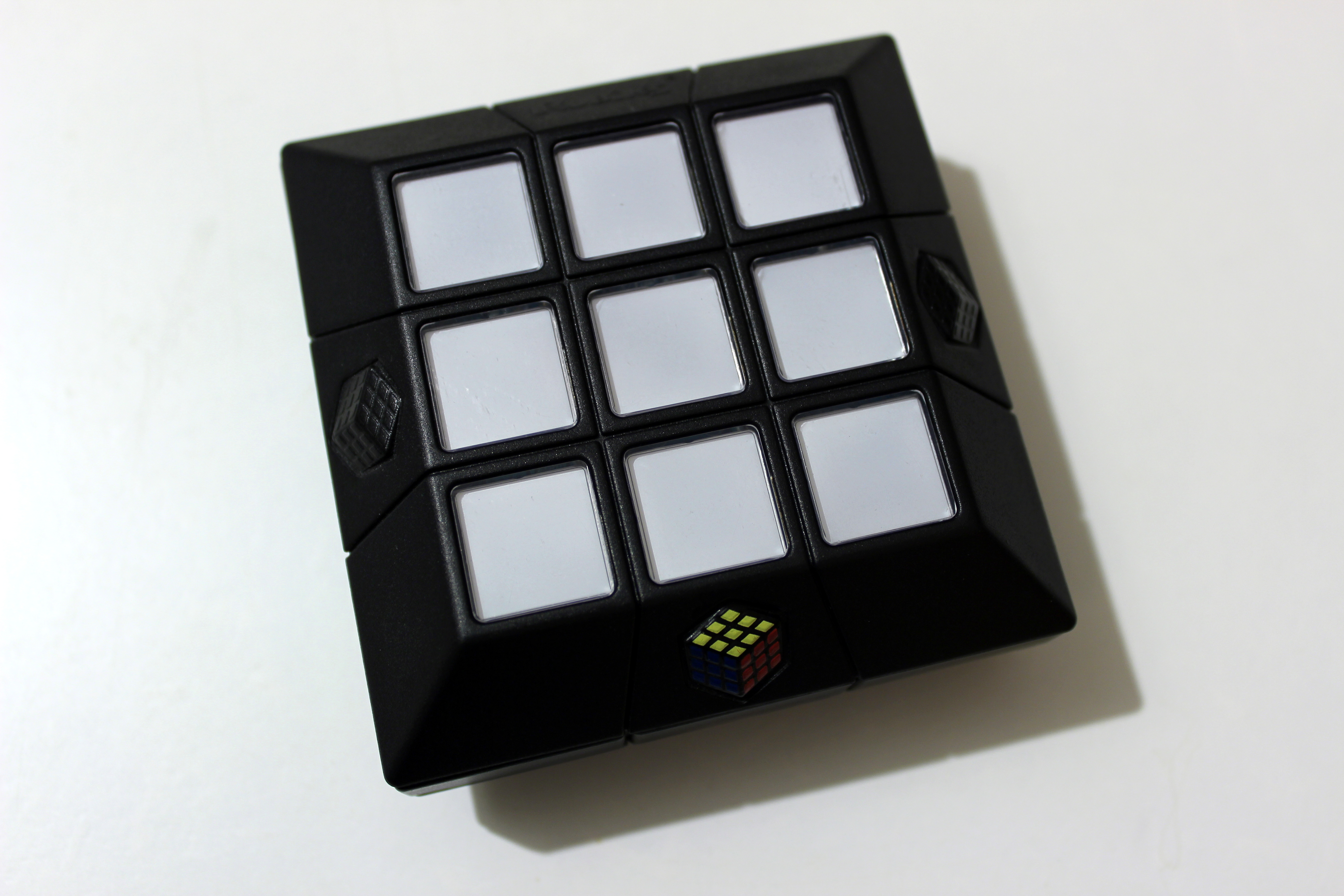
The puzzle, unlit

The puzzle is based around a 3x3 grid of translucent panels, each panel being illuminated from below with red and blue LEDs. The bank of panels is mounted on a central spring-loaded pivot that can both slide a short distance in each of the four cardinal directions, as well as rotate or yaw slightly around the pivot. Each Slide and Twist maneuver triggers a change in the game's state.

The CPU selects a random pattern of lights as the goal state, then it selects another random pattern of lights as the starting state. The latter pattern visibly illuminates the panels. The goal pattern can be viewed at will by holding a button on the side of the device. Reaching the goal states scores a point, and the CPU generates a new puzzle.

A Slide maneuver will shift all rows or columns one space in the direction of the push. Rows or columns that are shifted off the visible play area "wrap around" to the opposite side. A Twist maneuver's effect varies based on the difficulty setting.

The game has three difficulty settings:

=== Easy Difficulty ===
- Lights can be in one of two states: on or off.
- Lights that are on are all blue or all red i.e. only one colour is used in each puzzle.
- Twists shift the lights 90 degrees clockwise or counterclockwise, akin to the outcome of twisting one face of a traditional Rubik's Cube.

=== Medium Difficulty ===
- Lights can be in one of two states: on or off.
- Lights that are on are all blue or all red i.e. only one colour is used in each puzzle.
- Twists shift the lights 45 degrees clockwise or counterclockwise. The top left light moves to the top center position, the top center light moves to the top right position, the top right light moves to the right side position, and so on.

=== Hard Difficulty ===
- Lights can be in one of three states: off, red, or blue.
- Twists shift the lights 45 degrees clockwise or counterclockwise, as in medium difficulty.

== Criticism and reviews ==
Gizmodo praised the device for having a pleasing tactile quality and encouraging repeated play. Tech Crunch suggested it was fun and addictive.

== See also ==
- Sliding puzzle
