= Edward Hordern =

English puzzlist (1941–2000)

- Born: Lebbeus Edward A Hordern; 21 March 1941; Surrey, England
- Died: 2 May 2000 (aged 59); Oxfordshire, England
- Known for: Puzzles

Lebbeus Edward A Hordern (21 March 1941 – 2 May 2000), known as Edward Hordern, was an authority on sliding block puzzles, and was renowned for his puzzle solving abilities.

Hordern had an extensive mechanical puzzle collection and was an author on the topic of mechanical puzzles. His best known book is "Sliding Piece Puzzles", originally published in 1986 by Oxford University Press (ISBN 0-19-853204-0).

In 1993, Hordern edited, corrected and privately published a Centenary Edition of Puzzles Old & New by Professor Hoffmann, including photographs of many original puzzles of the 1890s, mostly from his own collection.

Hordern's family gave the puzzle collection, including the famed Hoffmann puzzles, to collector James Dalgety, co-founder of Pentangle Puzzles and curator of the Puzzle Museum.
