= Three cups problem =

Mathematical puzzle

The standard, unsolvable, arrangement of the three cups. As only one cup is upside down, turning it and another over leaves the other upside down.

The solvable version of the problem. Turning cups A and C over leaves all three upright.

The three cups problem, also known as the three cup challenge and other variants, is a mathematical puzzle that, in its most common form, cannot be solved.

In the beginning position of the problem, one cup is upside-down and the other two are right-side up. The objective is to turn all cups right-side up in no more than six moves, turning over exactly two cups at each move.

The solvable (but trivial) version of this puzzle begins with one cup right-side up and two cups upside-down. To solve the puzzle in a single move, turn up the two cups that are upside down — after which all three cups are facing up. As a magic trick, a magician can perform the solvable version in a convoluted way, and then ask an audience member to solve the unsolvable version.

== Proof of impossibility ==
To see that the problem is insolvable (when starting with just one cup upside down), it suffices to concentrate on the number of cups the wrong way up. Denoting this number by $W$, the goal of the problem is to change $W$ from 1 to 0, i.e., by $-1$. The problem is insolvable because any move changes $W$ by an even number. Since a move inverts two cups and each inversion changes $W$ by $+1$ (if the cup was the right way up) or $-1$ (otherwise), a move changes $W$ by the sum of two odd numbers, which is even, completing the proof.

Another way of looking is that, at the start, two cups are in the "right" orientation and one is "wrong". Changing one right cup and one wrong cup, the situation remains the same. Changing two right cups results in a situation with three wrong cups, after which the next move restores the original status of one wrong cup. Thus, any number of moves results in a situation either with three wrong cups or with one wrong cup, and never with zero wrong cups.

More generally, this argument shows that for any number of cups, it is impossible to reduce $W$ to 0 if it is initially odd. On the other hand, if $W$ is even, inverting cups two at a time will eventually result in $W$ equaling 0.

== See also ==
- List of impossible puzzles
- Puzzle
- Recreational mathematics
