= Minus Cube =

Rearrangement puzzle

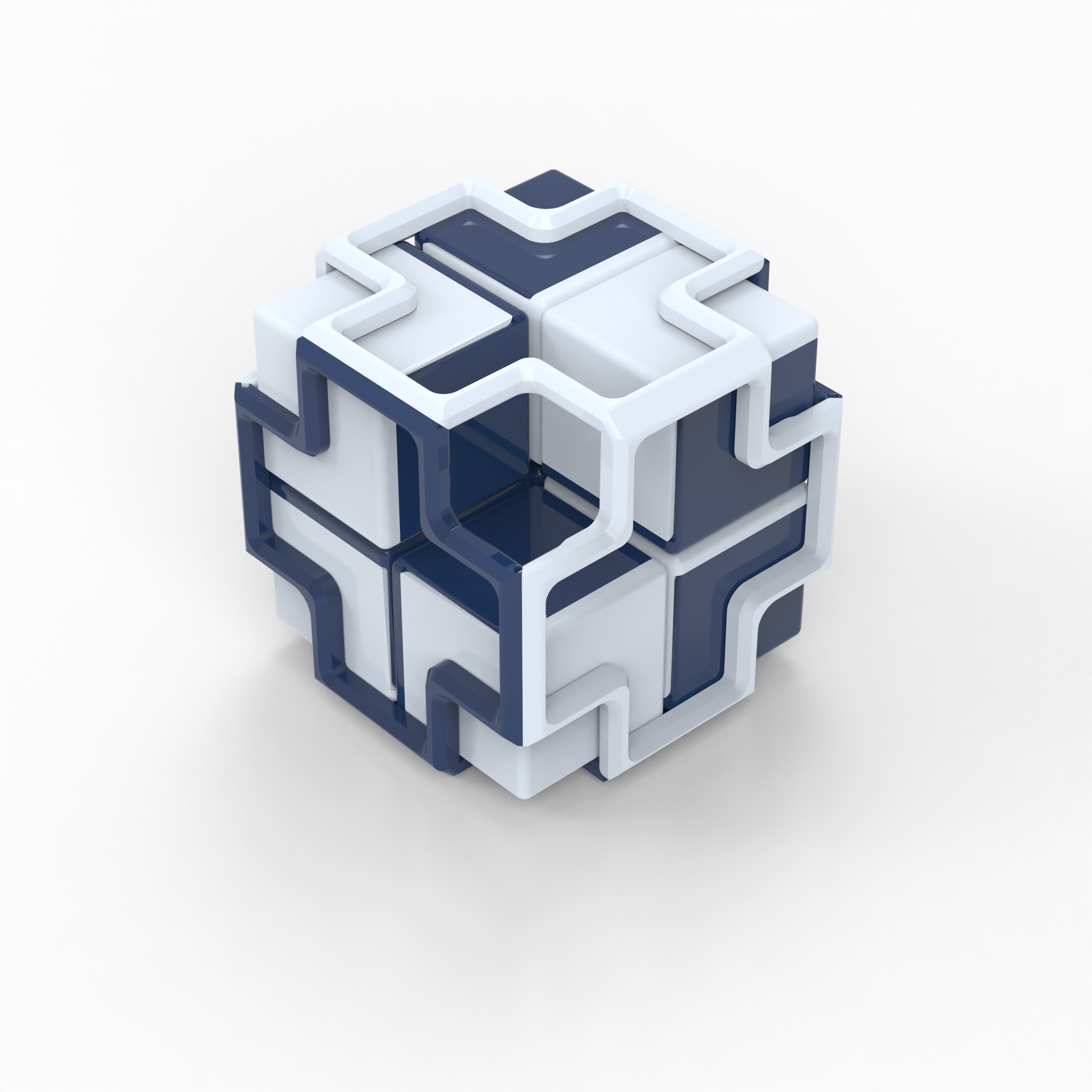
Minus Cube New Design

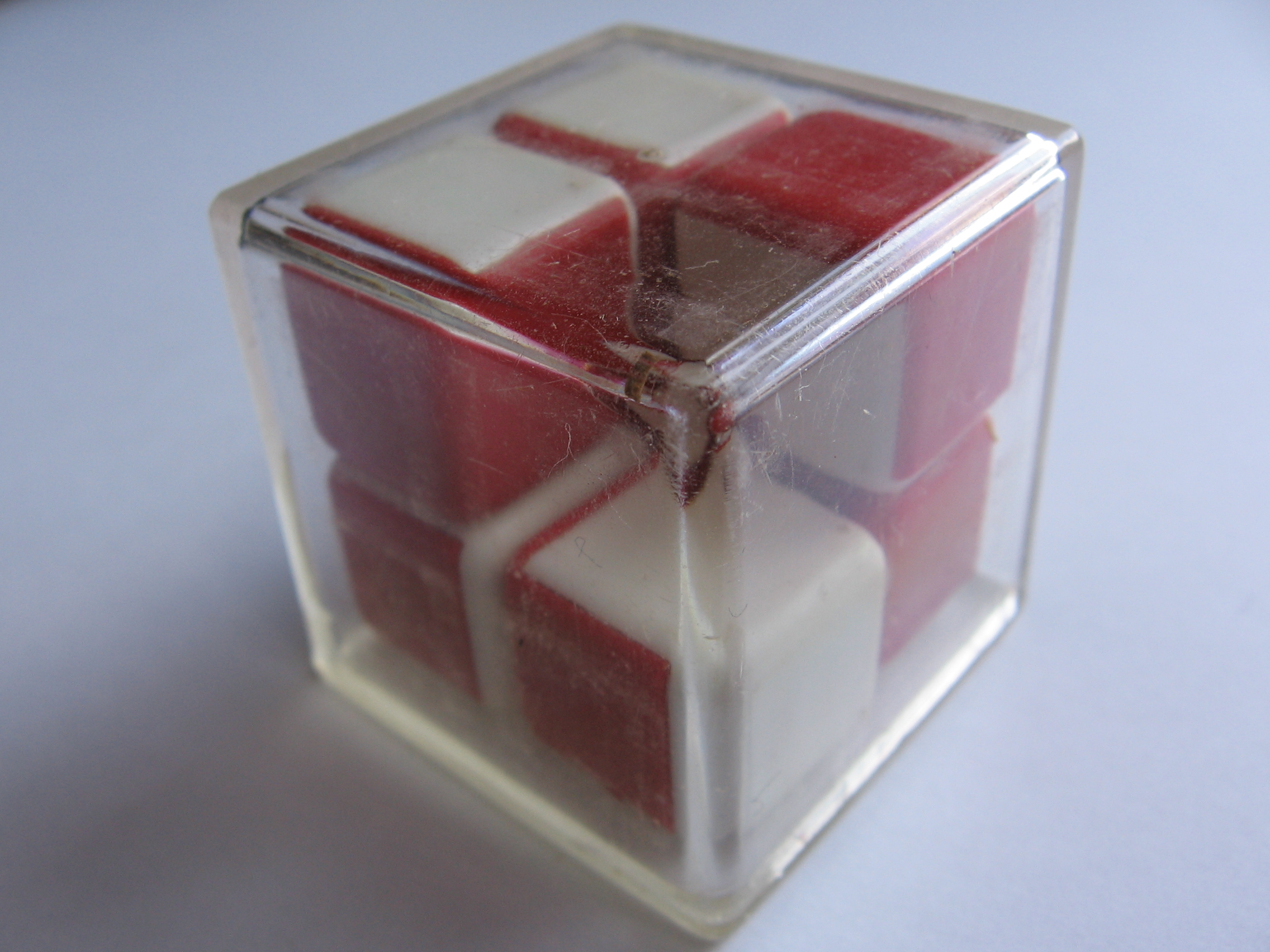
The Minus Cube puzzle

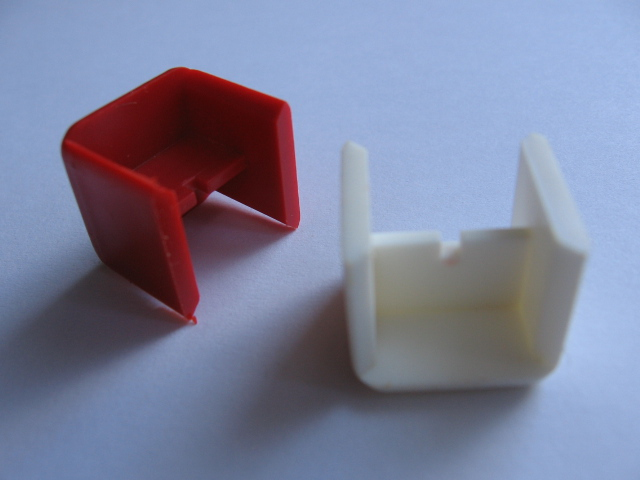
A small cube of the Minus Cube in the disassembled state

The Minus Cube (aka BLOXBOX by Piet Hein; aka Varikon Box) is a 3D mechanical variant of the n-puzzle, which was manufactured in the Soviet Union. It consists of a bonded transparent plastic box containing seven small cubes, each glued together from two U-shape parts: one white and one coloured. The length of one side of the interior of the box is slightly more than twice the length of the side of a small cube. There is an empty space for one small cube inside the box, and the small cubes are moveable inside the box by tilting the box, causing a cube to fall into the space. The goal of the puzzle is to shuffle the cubes in such a way that on each side of the box, all of the faces of the small cubes have the same color.

There were two types of Minus Cubes manufactured: the so-called "Moscow Minus Cube" (red–white) and "Sverdlovsk Minus Cube" (blue–white), each named after the cities in which they were produced. They differed only in the orientation of one of the small cubes. Because of this difference, there are 12 times as many "solved" arrangements for the Moscow Minus Cube, and thus the Sverdlovsk Minus Cube is 12 times as difficult to solve. However, if one does not confine oneself to these two types of the Minus Cube, there are 48 Minus Cube variants that can be solved.

== See also ==
- 15 puzzle
- Combination puzzle
- Mechanical puzzle
