= List of recreational number theory topics =

This is a list of recreational number theory topics (see number theory, recreational mathematics). Listing here is not pejorative: many famous topics in number theory have origins in challenging problems posed purely for their own sake.

See list of number theory topics for pages dealing with aspects of number theory with more consolidated theories.

== Number sequences ==
- Integer sequence
- Fibonacci sequence
  - Golden mean base
  - Fibonacci coding
- Lucas sequence
- Padovan sequence
- Figurate numbers
  - Polygonal number
    - Triangular number
    - Square number
    - Pentagonal number
    - Hexagonal number
    - Heptagonal number
    - Octagonal number
    - Nonagonal number
    - Decagonal number
  - Centered polygonal number
    - Centered square number
    - Centered pentagonal number
    - Centered hexagonal number
  - Tetrahedral number
  - Pyramidal number
    - Triangular pyramidal number
    - Square pyramidal number
    - Pentagonal pyramidal number
    - Hexagonal pyramidal number
    - Heptagonal pyramidal number
  - Octahedral number
  - Star number
- Perfect number
  - Quasiperfect number
  - Almost perfect number
  - Multiply perfect number
  - Hyperperfect number
  - Semiperfect number
  - Primitive semiperfect number
  - Unitary perfect number
  - Weird number
- Untouchable number
- Amicable number
- Sociable number
- Abundant number
- Deficient number
- Amenable number
- Aliquot sequence
- Super-Poulet number
- Lucky number
- Powerful number
- Primeval number
- Palindromic number
- Telephone number
- Triangular square number
- Harmonic divisor number
- Sphenic number
- Smith number
- Double Mersenne number
- Zeisel number
- Heteromecic number
- Niven numbers
- Superparticular number
- Highly composite number
- Highly totient number
- Practical number
- Juggler sequence
- Look-and-say sequence

== Digits ==
- Polydivisible number
- Automorphic number
- Armstrong number
- Self number
- Harshad number
- Keith number
- Kaprekar number
- Digit sum
- Persistence of a number
- Perfect digital invariant
  - Happy number
- Perfect digit-to-digit invariant
- Factorion
- Emirp
- Palindromic prime
- Home prime
- Normal number
  - Stoneham number
  - Champernowne constant
  - Absolutely normal number
- Repunit
- Repdigit

== Prime and related sequences ==
- Semiprime
- Almost prime
- Unique prime
- Factorial prime
- Permutable prime
- Palindromic prime
- Cuban prime
- Lucky prime

== Magic squares, etc. ==
- Ulam spiral
- Magic star
- Magic square
  - Frénicle standard form
  - Prime reciprocal magic square
  - Trimagic square
  - Multimagic square
  - Panmagic square
  - Satanic square
  - Most-perfect magic square
  - Geometric magic square
  - Conway's Lux method for magic squares
- Magic cube
  - Perfect magic cube
  - Semiperfect magic cube
  - Bimagic cube
  - Trimagic cube
  - Multimagic cube
- Magic hypercube
- Magic constant
- Squaring the square
