= Multimagic cube =

In mathematics, a P-multimagic cube is a magic cube that remains magic even if all its numbers are replaced by their kth powers for 1 ≤ k ≤ P. 2-multimagic cubes are called bimagic, 3-multimagic cubes are called trimagic, and 4-multimagic cubes tetramagic. A P-multimagic cube is said to be semi-perfect if the kth power cubes are perfect for 1 ≤ k < P, and the Pth power cube is semiperfect. If all P of the power cubes are perfect, the P-multimagic cube is said to be perfect.

The first known example of a bimagic cube was given by John Hendricks in 2000; it is a semiperfect cube of order 25 and magic constant 195325. In 2003, C. Bower discovered two semi-perfect bimagic cubes of order 16, and a perfect bimagic cube of order 32.

MathWorld reports that only two trimagic cubes are known, discovered by C. Bower in 2003; a semiperfect cube of order 64 and a perfect cube of order 256. It also reports that he discovered the only two known tetramagic cubes, a semiperfect cube of order 1024, and perfect cube of order 8192.

In 2011, Emlyn Ellis Addison found a mod-9 symmetric semiperfect tetramagic cube of order 9, intended as a methodology for structuring musical compositions.

== See also ==
- Magic square
- Multimagic square
