= Multimagic square =

Type of magic square

In mathematics, a P-multimagic square (also known as a satanic square) is a magic square that remains magic even if all its numbers are replaced by their kth powers for 1 ≤ k ≤ P. 2-multimagic squares are called bimagic, 3-multimagic squares are called trimagic, 4-multimagic squares tetramagic, and 5-multimagic squares pentamagic.

== Constants for normal squares ==
If the squares are normal, the constant for the power-squares can be determined as follows:

Bimagic series totals for bimagic squares are also linked to the square-pyramidal number sequence is as follows :-
Squares 0, 1, 4, 9, 16, 25, 36, 49, .... (sequence A000290 in the OEIS)
Sum of Squares 0, 1, 5, 14, 30, 55, 91, 140, 204, 285, ... (sequence A000330 in the OEIS) )number of units in a square-based pyramid)
The bimagic series is the 1st, 4th, 9th in this series (divided by 1, 2, 3, n) etc. so values for the rows and columns in order-1, order-2, order-3 Bimagic squares would be 1, 15, 95, 374, 1105, 2701, 5775, 11180, ... (sequence A052459 in the OEIS)

The trimagic series would be related in the same way to the hyper-pyramidal sequence of nested cubes.
Cubes 0, 1, 8, 27, 64, 125, 216, ... (sequence A000578 in the OEIS)
Sum of Cubes 0, 1, 9, 36, 100, ... (sequence A000537 in the OEIS)
Value for Trimagic squares 1, 50, 675, 4624, ... (sequence A052460 in the OEIS)

Similarly the tetramagic sequence
4-Power 0, 1, 16, 81, 256, 625, 1296, ... (sequence A000583 in the OEIS)
Sum of 4-Power 0, 1, 17, 98, 354, 979, 2275, ... (sequence A000538 in the OEIS)
Sums for Tetramagic squares 0, 1, 177, ... (sequence A052461 in the OEIS)

== Bimagic square ==
A bimagic square is a magic square that remains magic when all of its numbers are replaced by their squares.

The first known bimagic square has order 8 and magic constant 260 and a bimagic constant of 11180.

It has been conjectured by Bensen and Jacoby that no nontrivial bimagic squares of order less than 8 exist. This was shown for magic squares containing the elements 1 to n^{2} by Boyer and Trump.

However, J. R. Hendricks was able to show in 1998 that no bimagic square of order 3 exists, save for the trivial bimagic square containing the same number nine times. The proof is fairly simple: let the following be our bimagic square.

a	b	c
d	e	f
g	h	i

It is well known that a property of magic squares is that $a+i=2e$. Similarly, $a^2+i^2=2e^2$. Therefore, $(a-i)^2=2(a^2+i^2)-(a+i)^2=4e^2-4e^2=0$. It follows that $a=e=i$. The same holds for all lines going through the center.

For 4 × 4 squares, Luke Pebody was able to show by similar methods that the only 4 × 4 bimagic squares (up to symmetry) are of the form

a	b	c	d
c	d	a	b
d	c	b	a
b	a	d	c

or

a	a	b	b
b	b	a	a
a	a	b	b
b	b	a	a

An 8 × 8 bimagic square.

16	41	36	5	27	62	55	18
26	63	54	19	13	44	33	8
1	40	45	12	22	51	58	31
23	50	59	30	4	37	48	9
38	3	10	47	49	24	29	60
52	21	32	57	39	2	11	46
43	14	7	34	64	25	20	53
61	28	17	56	42	15	6	35

Nontrivial bimagic squares are now (2010) known for any order from eight to 64. Li Wen of China created the first known bimagic squares of orders 34, 37, 38, 41, 43, 46, 47, 53, 58, 59, 61, 62 filling the gaps of the last unknown orders.

In 2006 Jaroslaw Wroblewski built a non-normal bimagic square of order 6. Non-normal means that it uses non-consecutive integers.

Also in 2006 Lee Morgenstern built several non-normal bimagic squares of order 7.

== Trimagic square ==
A trimagic square is a magic square that remains magic when all of its numbers are replaced by their cubes.

Trimagic squares of orders 12, 32, 64, 81 and 128 have been discovered so far; the only known trimagic square of order 12, given below, was found in June 2002 by German mathematician Walter Trump.

1	22	33	41	62	66	79	83	104	112	123	144
9	119	45	115	107	93	52	38	30	100	26	136
75	141	35	48	57	14	131	88	97	110	4	70
74	8	106	49	12	43	102	133	96	39	137	71
140	101	124	42	60	37	108	85	103	21	44	5
122	76	142	86	67	126	19	78	59	3	69	23
55	27	95	135	130	89	56	15	10	50	118	90
132	117	68	91	11	99	46	134	54	77	28	13
73	64	2	121	109	32	113	36	24	143	81	72
58	98	84	116	138	16	129	7	29	61	47	87
80	34	105	6	92	127	18	53	139	40	111	65
51	63	31	20	25	128	17	120	125	114	82	94

== Higher order ==
The first 4-magic square was constructed by Charles Devimeux in 1983 and was a 256-order square.

A 4-magic square of order 512 was constructed in May 2001 by André Viricel and Christian Boyer.

The first 5-magic square, of order 1024 arrived about one month later, in June 2001 again by Viricel and Boyer. They also presented a smaller 4-magic square of order 256 in January 2003. Another 5-magic square, of order 729, was constructed in June 2003 by Li Wen.

== See also ==
- Diabolic square
- Magic cube
- Magic square
- Multimagic cube
