= Magic series =

A magic series is a set of distinct positive integers which add up to the magic constant of a magic square and a magic cube, thus potentially making up lines in magic tesseracts.

So, in an n × n magic square using the numbers from 1 to n^{2}, a magic series is a set of n distinct numbers adding up to n(n^{2} + 1)/2. For n = 2, there are just two magic series, 1+4 and 2+3. The eight magic series when n = 3 all appear in the rows, columns and diagonals of a 3 × 3 magic square.

Maurice Kraitchik gave the number of magic series up to n = 7 in Mathematical Recreations in 1942 (sequence A052456 in the OEIS). In 2002, Henry Bottomley extended this up to n = 36 and independently Walter Trump up to n = 32. In 2005, Trump extended this to n = 54 (over 2 × 10^{111}) while Bottomley gave an experimental approximation for the numbers of magic series:

$$\frac{1}{\pi} \cdot \sqrt{\frac{3}{e}} \cdot \frac{(e n)^n}{n^3-\frac{3}{5}n^2+\frac{2}{7}n}$$

In July 2006, Robert Gerbicz extended this sequence up to n = 150.

In 2013 Dirk Kinnaes was able to exploit his insight that the magic series could be related to the volume of a polytope. Trump used this new approach to extend the sequence up to n = 1000.

Mike Quist showed that the exact second-order count has a multiplicative factor of $\tfrac{1}{n^3}\!\left(1+\tfrac{3}{5n}+\tfrac{31}{420n^2}+\cdots\right)$ equivalent to a denominator of $n^3-\tfrac{3}{5}n^2+\left(\tfrac{2}{7} + \tfrac{1}{2100} \right)\!n+ \cdots.$

Richard Schroeppel in 1973 published the complete enumeration of the order 5 magic squares at 275,305,224. This recent magic series work gives hope that the relationship between the magic series and the magic square may provide an exact count for order 6 or order 7 magic squares. Consider an intermediate structure that lies in complexity between the magic series and the magic square. It might be described as an amalgamation of 4 magic series that have only one unique common integer. This structure forms the two major diagonals and the central row and column for an odd order magic square. Building blocks such as these could be the way forward.
