= Home prime =

In number theory, the home prime HP(n) of an integer n greater than 1 is the prime number obtained by repeatedly factoring the increasing concatenation of prime factors including repetitions. The mth intermediate stage in the process of determining HP(n) is designated HPn(m). For instance, HP(10) = 773, as 10 factors as 2×5 yielding HP10(1) = 25, 25 factors as 5×5 yielding HP10(2) = HP25(1) = 55, 55 = 5×11 implies HP10(3) = HP25(2) = HP55(1) = 511, and 511 = 7×73 gives HP10(4) = HP25(3) = HP55(2) = HP511(1) = 773, a prime number. Some sources use the alternative notation HPn for the homeprime, leaving out parentheses. Investigations into home primes make up a minor side issue in number theory. Its questions have served as test fields for the implementation of efficient algorithms for factoring composite numbers, but the subject is really one in recreational mathematics.

The outstanding computational problem as of 2016 is whether HP(49) = HP(77) can be calculated in practice. As each iteration is greater than the previous up until a prime is reached, factorizations generally grow more difficult so long as an end is not reached. As of August 2016 the pursuit of HP(49) concerns the factorization of a 251-digit composite factor of HP49(119) after a break was achieved on 3 December 2014 with the calculation of HP49(117). This followed the factorization of HP49(110) on 8 September 2012 and of HP49(104) on 11 January 2011, and prior calculations extending for the larger part of a decade that made extensive use of computational resources. Details of the history of this search, as well as the sequences leading to home primes for all other numbers through 100, are maintained at Patrick De Geest's worldofnumbers website. A wiki primarily associated with the Great Internet Mersenne Prime Search maintains the complete known data through 1000 in base 10 and also has lists for the bases 2 through 9.

The primes in HP(n) are

2, 3, 211, 5, 23, 7, 3331113965338635107, 311, 773, 11, 223, 13, 13367, 1129, 31636373, 17, 233, 19, 3318308475676071413, 37, 211, 23, 331319, 773, 3251, 13367, 227, 29, 547, ... (sequence A037274 in the OEIS)

Aside from the computational problems that have had so much time devoted to them, it appears absolute proof of existence of a home prime for any specific number might entail its effective computation. In purely heuristic terms, the existence has probability 1 for all numbers, but such heuristics make assumptions about numbers drawn from a wide variety of processes that, though they are likely correct, fall short of the standard of proof usually required of mathematical claims.

== Properties ==
- HP(n) = n for n prime.

== Early history and additional terminology ==
While it is likely that the idea was conceived of numerous times in the past, the first reference in print appears to be an article written in 1990 in a small and now-defunct publication called Recreational and Educational Computation. The same person who authored that article, Jeffrey Heleen, revisited the subject in the 1996–7 volume of the Journal of Recreational Mathematics in an article entitled Family Numbers: Constructing Primes By Prime Factor Splicing, which included all of the results HP(n) for n through 100 other than the ones still unresolved. It also included a now-obsolete list of 3-digit unresolved numbers (The 58 listed have been cut precisely in half as of August 2012). It appears that this article is largely responsible for provoking attempts by others to resolve the case involving 49 and 77. The article uses the terms daughter and parent to describe composites and the primes that they lead to, with numbers leading to the same home prime called siblings (even if one is an iterate of another), and calls the number of iterations required to reach a parent, the persistence of a number under the map to obtain a home prime, the number of lives. The brief article does little other than state the origins of the subject, define terms, give a couple of examples, mention machinery and methods used at the time, and then provide tables. It appears that Mr. De Geest is responsible for the notation now in use. The OEIS also uses homeliness as the term for the number of numbers, including the prime itself, that have a certain prime as its home prime.

== See also ==
- List of recreational number theory topics
- Prime factorization
- Persistence of a number
- Concatenation (mathematics)
