= Luoshu Square =

Ancient Chinese diagram

- The traditional Luoshu diagram

- The equivalent magic square

Luoshu
- Traditional Chinese: 洛書 雒書
- Simplified Chinese: 洛书
Transcriptions
Standard Mandarin
- Hanyu Pinyin: Luòshū
- Wade–Giles: Lo Shu

Nine Halls Diagram
- Traditional Chinese: 九宮圖
- Simplified Chinese: 九宫图
Transcriptions
Standard Mandarin
- Hanyu Pinyin: Jiǔgōngtú
- Wade–Giles: Chiu-kung-t'u

Vietnamese name
- Vietnamese: Lạc Thư

Korean name
- Hangul: 낙서
Transcriptions
- Revised Romanization: Nakseo
- McCune–Reischauer: Naksŏ

Japanese name
- Kanji: 洛書
- Hiragana: らくしょ
Transcriptions
- Revised Hepburn: Rakusho

The Luoshu (pinyin), Lo Shu (Wade-Giles), or Nine Halls Diagram is an ancient Chinese diagram and named for the Luo River near Luoyang, Henan. The Luoshu appears in myths concerning the invention of writing by Cangjie and other culture heroes. It is a unique normal magic square of order three. It is usually paired with the River Map or Hetu—named in reference to the Yellow River—and used with the River Map in various contexts involving Chinese geomancy, numerology, philosophy, and early natural science.

== Traditions ==
The Lo Shu is part of the legacy of ancient Chinese mathematical and divination (cf. the I Ching 易經) traditions, and is an important emblem in Feng Shui (風水)—the art of geomancy concerned with the placement of objects in relation to the flow of qi (氣), or "natural energy".

== History ==
A Chinese legend concerning the pre-historic Emperor Yu (夏禹) tells of the Lo Shu, often in connection with the Yellow River Map (Hetu) and the eight trigrams. In ancient China there is a legend of a huge deluge: the people offered sacrifices to the god of one of the flooding rivers, the Luo river (洛河), to try to calm his anger. A magical turtle emerged from the water with the curiously unnatural Lo Shu pattern on its shell: circular dots representing the integers one through nine are arranged in a three-by-three grid.

Early records dated to 650 BCE are ambiguous, referring to a "river map", but clearly start to refer to a magic square by 80 CE, and explicitly give an example of one since 570 CE. Recent publications have provided support that the Lo Shu Magic Square was an important model for time and space. It served as a basis for city planning, and tomb and temple design. The magic square was incidentally used to designate spaces of political and religious importance.

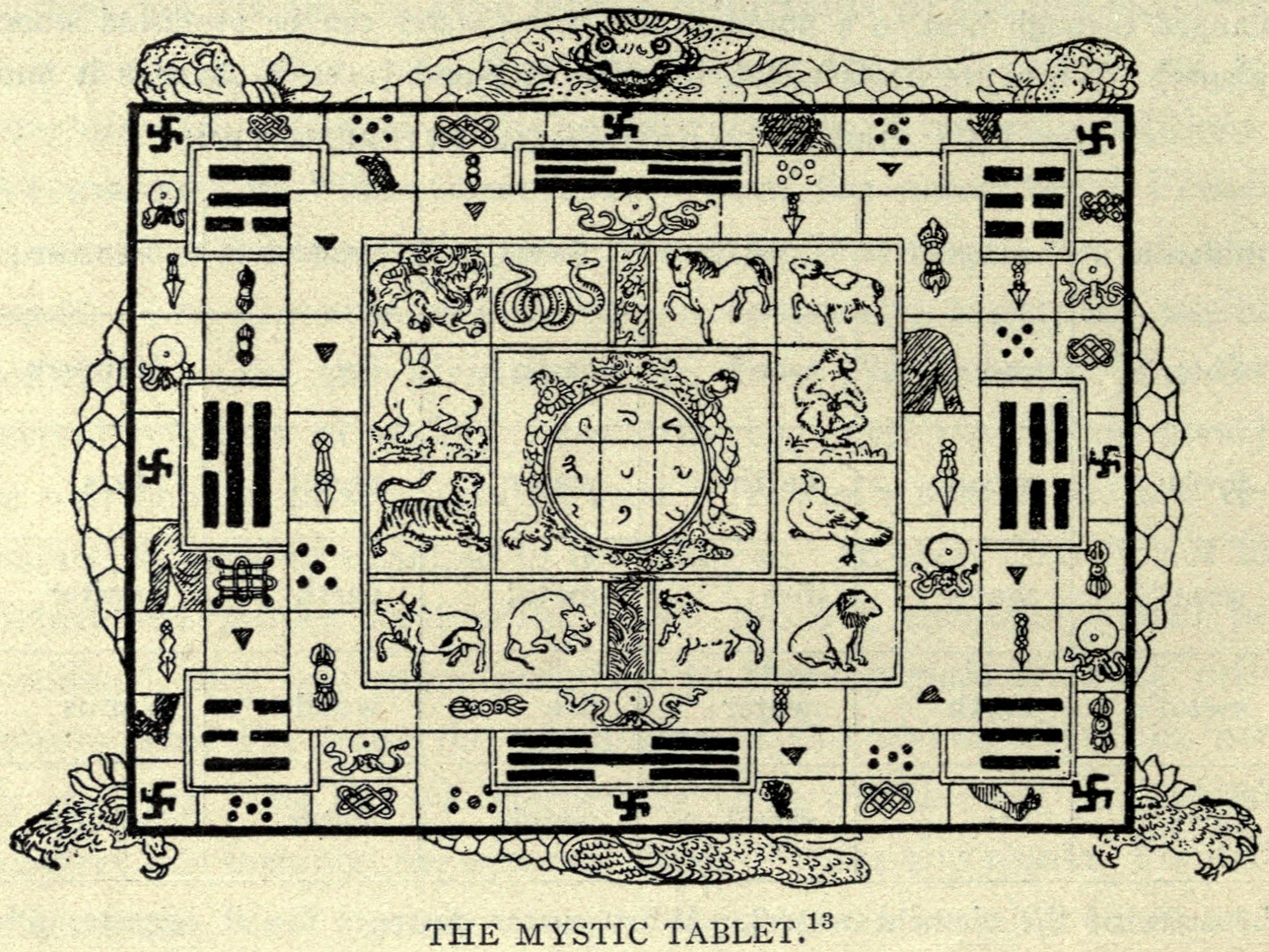
The Lo Shu square on the back of a small turtle (in the center), surrounded by the signs of the Chinese zodiac and the Eight Trigrams, are all carried by a large turtle (that presumably stands for the Dragon horse that had earlier revealed the trigrams to Fu Xi). This example drawn by an anonymous Tibetan artist.

== The layout ==
The odd and even numbers alternate in the periphery of the Lo Shu pattern; the four even numbers are at the four corners, and the five odd numbers (which outnumber the even numbers by one) form a cross in the center of the square. The sums in each of the three rows, in each of the three columns, and in both diagonals, are all 15. (Note: 15 is the number of days in each of the 24 cycles of the Chinese solar year.) Since "5" is in the center cell, the sum of any two other cells that are directly through the five from each other must be 10; e.g., opposite squares and corners add up to 10, the number of the Yellow River Map.

== In numerology ==
The Lo Shu is sometimes connected numerologically with the "Bagua" (八卦 or eight trigrams"), that can be arranged in the eight outer cells, reminiscent of circular trigram diagrams. Because north is placed at the bottom of maps in China, the 3x3 magic square having number 1 at the bottom and 9 at the top is used in preference to the other rotations/reflections. As seen in the "Later Heaven" arrangement, 1 and 9 correspond with ☵ Kǎn 坎 "Water 水" and ☲ Lí 離 "Fire 火" respectively. In the "Early Heaven" arrangement, they would correspond with ☷ Kūn 坤 "Earth 地" and ☰ Qián 乾 "Heaven 天" respectively. Like the Yellow River Map, the Lo Shu square, in conjunction with the Bagua, is sometimes used as a mandalic representation important in Feng Shui geomancy.

== See also ==
- Associative magic square
- Camunian rose
- Sator Square
- Tetractys
- Yellow River Map
- Chinese: 河圖洛書

== Bibliography ==
- Cammann, Schuyler (Summer 1961). "The Magic Square of Three in Old Chinese Philosophy and Religion". History of Religions. 1 (1): 37–80. doi:10.1086/462439. S2CID 162306354.
- Schinz, Alfred (1996). The Magic Square: Cities in Ancient China. Axel Menges. ISBN 9783930698028.
- Yoshio, Mikami (1913). The Development of Mathematics in China and Japan. LCCN 61-13497.
