= Broken space diagonal =

In a magic cube, a broken space diagonal is a sequence of cells of the cube that follows a line parallel to a space diagonal of the cube, and continues on the corresponding point of an opposite face whenever it reaches a face of the cube. The corresponding concept in two-dimensional magic squares is a broken diagonal.
