= Associative magic square =

Mathematical concept of arrangement of numbers in a square

In the Lo Shu Square, pairs of opposite numbers sum to 10

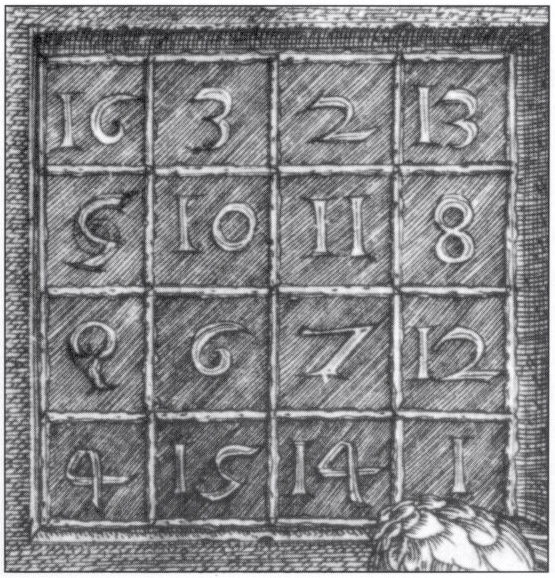
Detail from Melencolia I showing a 4 × 4 associative square

An associative magic square is a magic square for which each pair of numbers symmetrically opposite to the center sum up to the same value. For an n × n square, filled with the numbers from 1 to n^{2}, this common sum must equal n^{2} + 1. These squares are also called associated magic squares, regular magic squares, regmagic squares, or symmetric magic squares.

== Examples ==
For instance, the Lo Shu Square – the unique 3 × 3 magic square – is associative, because each pair of opposite points form a line of the square together with the center point, so the sum of the two opposite points equals the sum of a line minus the value of the center point regardless of which two opposite points are chosen. The 4 × 4 magic square from Albrecht Dürer's 1514 engraving Melencolia I – also found in a 1765 letter of Benjamin Franklin – is also associative, with each pair of opposite numbers summing to 17.

== Existence and enumeration ==
The numbers of possible associative n × n magic squares for n = 3,4,5,..., counting two squares as the same whenever they differ only by a rotation or reflection, are:

1, 48, 48544, 0, 1125154039419854784, ... (sequence A081262 in the OEIS)

The number zero for n = 6 is an example of a more general phenomenon: associative magic squares do not exist for values of n that are singly even (equal to 2 modulo 4). Every associative magic square of even order forms a singular matrix, but associative magic squares of odd order can be singular or nonsingular.
