= Prime reciprocal magic square =

Type of magic square

A prime reciprocal magic square is a magic square using the decimal digits of the reciprocal of a prime number.

== Introduction ==
Consider a unit fraction, like 1/3 or 1/7. In base ten, the remainder, and so the digits, of 1/3 repeats at once: 0.3333.... However, the remainders of 1/7 repeat over six, or 7−1, digits: 1/7 = 0·142857142857142857... Examining the multiples of 1/7, each is a cyclic permutation of these six digits:
$$\begin{align}
1/7 & = 0.1 4 2 8 5 7\dots \\
2/7 & = 0.2 8 5 7 1 4\dots \\
3/7 & = 0.4 2 8 5 7 1\dots \\
4/7 & = 0.5 7 1 4 2 8\dots \\
5/7 & = 0.7 1 4 2 8 5\dots \\
6/7 & = 0.8 5 7 1 4 2\dots
\end{align}$$

If the digits are laid out as a square, each row and column sums to 1 + 4 + 2 + 8 + 5 + 7 = 27. This yields the smallest base-10 non-normal, prime reciprocal magic square:

1	4	2	8	5	7
2	8	5	7	1	4
4	2	8	5	7	1
5	7	1	4	2	8
7	1	4	2	8	5
8	5	7	1	4	2

In contrast with its rows and columns, the diagonals of this square do not sum to 27; however, their mean is 27, as one diagonal adds to 23 while the other adds to 31.

All prime reciprocals in any base with a $p - 1$ period will generate magic squares where all rows and columns produce a magic constant, and only a select few will be full, such that their diagonals, rows and columns collectively yield equal sums.

== Decimal expansions ==
In a full, or otherwise prime reciprocal magic square with $p - 1$ period, the even number of k−th rows in the square are arranged by multiples of $1/p$ — not necessarily consecutively — where a magic constant can be obtained.

For instance, an even repeating cycle from an odd, prime reciprocal of p that is divided into n−digit strings creates pairs of complementary sequences of digits that yield strings of nines (9) when added together:
$$\begin{align}
1/7 = & \text { } 0.142\;857\dots \\
+ & \text { } 0.857\;142\ldots = 6/7\\
& ------------ \\
& \text { } 0.999\;999\ldots \\
\\
1/13 = & \text { } 0.076\;923\;076\;923\dots \\
+ & \text { } 0.923\;076\;923\;076\ldots = 12/13\\
& ------------ \\
& \text { } 0.999\;999\;999\;999\ldots \\
\\
1/19 = & \text { } 0.052631578\;947368421\dots \\
+ & \text { } 0.947368421\;052631578\ldots = 18/19\\
& ------------ \\
& \text { } 0.999999999\;999999999\dots
\end{align}$$

This is a result of Midy's theorem. These complementary sequences are generated between multiples of prime reciprocals that add to 1.

More specifically, a factor n in the numerator of the reciprocal of a prime number p will shift the decimal places of its decimal expansion accordingly:
$$\begin{align}
1/23 & = 0.04347826\;08695652\;173913\ldots \\
2/23 & = 0.08695652\;17391304\;347826\ldots \\
4/23 & = 0.17391304\;34782608\;695652\ldots \\
8/23 & = 0.34782608\;69565217\;391304\ldots \\
16/23 & = 0.69565217\;39130434\;782608\ldots
\end{align}$$

In this case, a factor of 2 moves the repeating decimal of 1/23 by eight places.

A uniform solution of a prime reciprocal magic square, whether full or not, will hold rows with successive multiples of $1/p$. Other magic squares can be constructed whose rows do not represent consecutive multiples of $1/p$, which nonetheless generate a magic sum.

== Magic constant ==
some prime numbers that generate prime-reciprocal magic squares in given bases
Prime	Base	Magic sum
19	10	81
53	12	286
59	2	29
67	2	33
83	2	41
89	19	792
211	2	105
223	3	222
307	5	612
383	10	1,719
397	5	792
487	6	1,215
593	3	592
631	87	27,090
787	13	4,716
811	3	810
1,033	11	5,160
1,307	5	2,612
1,499	11	7,490
1,877	19	16,884
2,011	26	25,125
2,027	2	1,013

Magic squares based on reciprocals of primes p in bases b with periods $p - 1$ have magic sums equal to
$$M = (b-1) \times \frac {p-1}{2}.$$

== Full magic squares ==
The $\bold{\tfrac {1}{19}}$ magic square with maximum period 18 contains a row-and-column total of 81, that is also obtained by both diagonals. This makes it the first full, non-normal base-10 prime reciprocal magic square whose multiples fit inside respective $k$−th rows:

$$\begin{align}
1/19 & = 0. {\color{red}0} \text { } 5 \text { } 2 \text { } 6 \text { } 3 \text { } 1 \text { } 5 \text { } 7 \text { } 8 \text { } 9 \text { } 4 \text { } 7 \text { } 3 \text { } 6 \text { } 8 \text { } 4 \text { } 2 \text { } {\color{red}1} \dots \\
2/19 & = 0.1 \text { } {\color{red}0} \text { } 5 \text { } 2 \text { } 6 \text { } 3 \text { } 1 \text { } 5 \text { } 7 \text { } 8 \text { } 9 \text { } 4 \text { } 7 \text { } 3 \text { } 6 \text { } 8 \text { } {\color{red}4} \text { } 2 \dots \\
3/19 & = 0.1 \text { } 5 \text { } {\color{red}7} \text { } 8 \text { } 9 \text { } 4 \text { } 7 \text { } 3 \text { } 6 \text { } 8 \text { } 4 \text { } 2 \text { } 1 \text { } 0 \text { } 5 \text { } {\color{red}2} \text { } 6 \text { } 3 \dots \\
4/19 & = 0.2 \text { } 1 \text { } 0 \text { } {\color{red}5} \text { } 2 \text { } 6 \text { } 3 \text { } 1 \text { } 5 \text { } 7 \text { } 8 \text { } 9 \text { } 4 \text { } 7 \text { } {\color{red}3} \text { } 6 \text { } 8 \text { } 4 \dots \\
5/19 & = 0.2 \text { } 6 \text { } 3 \text { } 1 \text { } {\color{red}5} \text { } 7 \text { } 8 \text { } 9 \text { } 4 \text { } 7 \text { } 3 \text { } 6 \text { } 8 \text { } {\color{red}4} \text { } 2 \text { } 1 \text { } 0 \text { } 5 \dots \\
6/19 & = 0.3 \text { } 1 \text { } 5 \text { } 7 \text { } 8 \text { } {\color{red}9} \text { } 4 \text { } 7 \text { } 3 \text { } 6 \text { } 8 \text { } 4 \text { } {\color{red}2} \text { } 1 \text { } 0 \text { } 5 \text { } 2 \text { } 6 \dots \\
7/19 & = 0.3 \text { } 6 \text { } 8 \text { } 4 \text { } 2 \text { } 1 \text { } {\color{red}0} \text { } 5 \text { } 2 \text { } 6 \text { } 3 \text { } {\color{red}1} \text { } 5 \text { } 7 \text { } 8 \text { } 9 \text { } 4 \text { } 7 \dots \\
8/19 & = 0.4 \text { } 2 \text { } 1 \text { } 0 \text { } 5 \text { } 2 \text { } 6 \text { } {\color{red}3} \text { } 1 \text { } 5 \text { } {\color{red}7} \text { } 8 \text { } 9 \text { } 4 \text { } 7 \text { } 3 \text { } 6 \text { } 8 \dots \\
9/19 & = 0.4 \text { } 7 \text { } 3 \text { } 6 \text { } 8 \text { } 4 \text { } 2 \text { } 1 \text { } {\color{red}0} \text { } {\color{red}5} \text { } 2 \text { } 6 \text { } 3 \text { } 1 \text { } 5 \text { } 7 \text { } 8 \text { } 9 \dots \\
10/19 & = 0.5 \text { } 2 \text { } 6 \text { } 3 \text { } 1 \text { } 5 \text { } 7 \text { } 8 \text { } {\color{red}9} \text { } {\color{red}4} \text { } 7 \text { } 3 \text { } 6 \text { } 8 \text { } 4 \text { } 2 \text { } 1 \text { } 0 \dots \\
11/19 & = 0.5 \text { } 7 \text { } 8 \text { } 9 \text { } 4 \text { } 7 \text { } 3 \text { } {\color{red}6} \text { } 8 \text { } 4 \text { } {\color{red}2} \text { } 1 \text { } 0 \text { } 5 \text { } 2 \text { } 6 \text { } 3 \text { } 1 \dots \\
12/19 & = 0.6 \text { } 3 \text { } 1 \text { } 5 \text { } 7 \text { } 8 \text { } {\color{red}9} \text { } 4 \text { } 7 \text { } 3 \text { } 6 \text { } {\color{red}8} \text { } 4 \text { } 2 \text { } 1 \text { } 0 \text { } 5 \text { } 2 \dots \\
13/19 & = 0.6 \text { } 8 \text { } 4 \text { } 2 \text { } 1 \text { } {\color{red}0} \text { } 5 \text { } 2 \text { } 6 \text { } 3 \text { } 1 \text { } 5 \text { } {\color{red}7} \text { } 8 \text { } 9 \text { } 4 \text { } 7 \text { } 3 \dots \\
14/19 & = 0.7 \text { } 3 \text { } 6 \text { } 8 \text { } {\color{red}4} \text { } 2 \text { } 1 \text { } 0 \text { } 5 \text { } 2 \text { } 6 \text { } 3 \text { } 1 \text { } {\color{red}5} \text { } 7 \text { } 8 \text { } 9 \text { } 4 \dots \\
15/19 & = 0.7 \text { } 8 \text { } 9 \text { } {\color{red}4} \text { } 7 \text { } 3 \text { } 6 \text { } 8 \text { } 4 \text { } 2 \text { } 1 \text { } 0 \text { } 5 \text { } 2 \text { } {\color{red}6} \text { } 3 \text { } 1 \text { } 5 \dots \\
16/19 & = 0.8 \text { } 4 \text { } {\color{red}2} \text { } 1 \text { } 0 \text { } 5 \text { } 2 \text { } 6 \text { } 3 \text { } 1 \text { } 5 \text { } 7 \text { } 8 \text { } 9 \text { } 4 \text { } {\color{red}7} \text { } 3 \text { } 6 \dots \\
17/19 & = 0.8 \text { } {\color{red}9} \text { } 4 \text { } 7 \text { } 3 \text { } 6 \text { } 8 \text { } 4 \text { } 2 \text { } 1 \text { } 0 \text { } 5 \text { } 2 \text { } 6 \text { } 3 \text { } 1 \text { } {\color{red}5} \text { } 7 \dots \\
18/19 & = 0.{\color{red}9} \text { } 4 \text { } 7 \text { } 3 \text { } 6 \text { } 8 \text { } 4 \text { } 2 \text { } 1 \text { } 0 \text { } 5 \text { } 2 \text { } 6 \text { } 3 \text { } 1 \text { } 5 \text { } 7 \text { } {\color{red}8} \dots
\end{align}$$

The first few prime numbers in decimal whose reciprocals can be used to produce a non-normal, full prime reciprocal magic square of this type are

{19, 383, 32327, 34061, 45341, 61967, 65699, 117541, 158771, 405817, ...} (sequence A072359 in the OEIS).

The smallest prime number to yield such magic square in binary is 59 (111011_{2}), while in ternary it is 223 (22021_{3}); these are listed at A096339, and A096660.

=== Variations ===
A $\tfrac {1}{17}$ prime reciprocal magic square with maximum period of 16 and magic constant of 72 can be constructed where its rows represent non-consecutive multiples of one-seventeenth:

$$\begin{align}
1/17 & = 0.{\color{blue}0} \text { } 5 \; 8 \; 8 \; 2 \; 3 \; 5 \; 2 \; 9 \; 4 \; 1 \; 1 \; 7 \; 6 \; 4 \; {\color{blue}7} \dots \\
5/17 & = 0.2 \; {\color{blue}9} \; 4 \; 1 \; 1 \; 7 \; 6 \; 4 \; 7 \; 0 \; 5 \; 8 \; 8 \; 2 \; {\color{blue}3} \; 5 \dots \\
8/17 & = 0.4 \; 7 \; {\color{blue}0} \; 5 \; 8 \; 8 \; 2 \; 3 \; 5 \; 2 \; 9 \; 4 \; 1 \; {\color{blue}1} \; 7 \; 6 \dots \\
6/17 & = 0.3 \; 5 \; 2 \; {\color{blue}9} \; 4 \; 1 \; 1 \; 7 \; 6 \; 4 \; 7 \; 0 \; {\color{blue}5} \; 8 \; 8 \; 2 \dots \\
13/17 & = 0.7 \; 6 \; 4 \; 7 \; {\color{blue}0} \; 5 \; 8 \; 8 \; 2 \; 3 \; 5 \; {\color{blue}2} \; 9 \; 4 \; 1 \; 1 \dots \\
14/17 & = 0.8 \; 2 \; 3 \; 5 \; 2 \; {\color{blue}9} \; 4 \; 1 \; 1 \; 7 \; {\color{blue}6} \; 4 \; 7 \; 0 \; 5 \; 8 \dots \\
2/17 & = 0.1 \; 1 \; 7 \; 6 \; 4 \; 7 \; {\color{blue}0} \; 5 \; 8 \; {\color{blue}8} \; 2 \; 3 \; 5 \; 2 \; 9 \; 4 \dots \\
10/17 & = 0.5 \; 8 \; 8 \; 2 \; 3 \; 5 \; 2 \; {\color{blue}9} \; {\color{blue}4} \; 1 \; 1 \; 7 \; 6 \; 4 \; 7 \; 0 \dots \\
16/17 & = 0.9 \; 4 \; 1 \; 1 \; 7 \; 6 \; 4 \; {\color{blue}7} \; {\color{blue}0} \; 5 \; 8 \; 8 \; 2 \; 3 \; 5 \; 2 \dots \\
12/17 & = 0.7 \; 0 \; 5 \; 8 \; 8 \; 2 \; {\color{blue}3} \; 5 \; 2 \; {\color{blue}9} \; 4 \; 1 \; 1 \; 7 \; 6 \; 4 \dots \\
9/17 & = 0.5 \; 2 \; 9 \; 4 \; 1 \; {\color{blue}1} \; 7 \; 6 \; 4 \; 7 \; {\color{blue}0} \; 5 \; 8 \; 8 \; 2 \; 3 \dots \\
11/17 & = 0.6 \; 4 \; 7 \; 0 \; {\color{blue}5} \; 8 \; 8 \; 2 \; 3 \; 5 \; 2 \; {\color{blue}9} \; 4 \; 1 \; 1 \; 7 \dots \\
4/17 & = 0.2 \; 3 \; 5 \; {\color{blue}2} \; 9 \; 4 \; 1 \; 1 \; 7 \; 6 \; 4 \; 7 \; {\color{blue}0} \; 5 \; 8 \; 8 \dots \\
3/17 & = 0.1 \; 7 \; {\color{blue}6} \; 4 \; 7 \; 0 \; 5 \; 8 \; 8 \; 2 \; 3 \; 5 \; 2 \; {\color{blue}9} \; 4 \; 1 \dots \\
15/17 & = 0.8 \; {\color{blue}8} \; 2 \; 3 \; 5 \; 2 \; 9 \; 4 \; 1 \; 1 \; 7 \; 6 \; 4 \; 7 \; {\color{blue}0} \; 5 \dots \\
7/17 & = 0.{\color{blue}4} \; 1 \; 1 \; 7 \; 6 \; 4 \; 7 \; 0 \; 5 \; 8 \; 8 \; 2 \; 3 \; 5 \; 2 \; {\color{blue}9} \dots
\end{align}$$

As such, this full magic square is the first of its kind in decimal that does not admit a uniform solution where consecutive multiples of $1/p$ fit in respective $k$−th rows.

== See also ==
- Cyclic number
- Reciprocals of primes
