= Magic star =

Special arrangement of numbers on a star

An n-pointed magic star is a star polygon with Schläfli symbol {n/2} in which numbers are placed at each of the n vertices and n intersections, such that the four numbers on each line sum to the same magic constant. A normal magic star contains the integers from 1 to 2n with no numbers repeated. The magic constant of an n-pointed normal magic star is M = 4n + 2.

No star polygons with fewer than 5 points exist, and the construction of a normal 5-pointed magic star turns out to be impossible. It can be proven that there exists no 4-pointed star that will satisfy the conditions here. The smallest examples of normal magic stars are therefore 6-pointed. Some examples are given below. Notice that for specific values of n, the n-pointed magic stars are also known as magic hexagrams (n = 6), magic heptagrams (n = 7), etc.

Magic hexagram M = 26	Magic heptagram M = 30	Magic octagram M = 34

The number of distinct normal magic stars of type {n/2} for n up to 15 is,

0, 80, 72, 112, 3014, 10882, 53528, 396930, 2434692, 15278390, 120425006, ... (sequence A200720 in the OEIS).

== See also ==
- Magic square
