= Semiperfect magic cube =

In mathematics, a semiperfect magic cube is a magic cube that is not a perfect magic cube, i.e., a magic cube for which the cross section diagonals do not necessarily sum up to the cube's magic constant.
