= Walter Trump =

German mathematician

Walter Trump (born 1953) is a German mathematician from Bavaria and a retired high school teacher. He is known for his work in recreational mathematics.

Trump has made contributions working on the square packing problem and the magic tile problem. In 1979, he discovered the optimal packing of 11 equal squares in a larger square with a side length of approximately 3.877084, though he did not prove its optimality. The optimality of his packing was shown on September 29, 2026, in an AI-assisted proof. In 2003, along with Christian Boyer, he developed the first known magic cube of order 5. In 2012, Trump et al. described a model for retention of liquid on random surfaces. In 2014, he and Francis Gaspalou were able to calculate all 8 × 8 bimagic squares.

Until he retired in 2015, Trump worked as a teacher for mathematics and physics at the Gymnasium in Stein, Bavaria.
