= Magic cube =

Mathematical concept

An example of a 3 × 3 × 3 magic cube. In this example, no slice is a magic square. In this case, the cube is classed as a simple magic cube.

In mathematics, a magic cube is the 3-dimensional equivalent of a magic square, that is, a collection of integers arranged in an n × n × n pattern such that the sums of the numbers on each row, on each column, on each pillar and on each of the four main space diagonals are equal, the so-called magic constant of the cube, denoted M_{3}(n). If a magic cube consists of the numbers 1, 2, ..., n^{3}, then it has magic constant (sequence A027441 in the OEIS)

$$M_3(n) = \frac{n(n^3+1)}{2}.$$

If, in addition, the numbers on every cross section diagonal also sum up to the cube's magic number, the cube is called a perfect magic cube; otherwise, it is called a semiperfect magic cube. The number n is called the order of the magic cube. If the sums of numbers on a magic cube's broken space diagonals also equal the cube's magic number, the cube is called a pandiagonal magic cube.

== Alternative definition ==
In recent years, an alternative definition for the perfect magic cube has gradually come into use. It is based on the fact that a pandiagonal magic square has traditionally been called "perfect", because all possible lines sum correctly. That is not the case with the above definition for the cube.

== Multimagic cubes ==
As in the case of magic squares, a bimagic cube has the additional property of remaining a magic cube when all of the entries are squared, a trimagic cube remains a magic cube under both the operations of squaring the entries and of cubing the entries (Only two of these are known, as of 2005.) A tetramagic cube remains a magic cube when the entries are squared, cubed, or raised to the fourth power.

John R. Hendricks of Canada (1929–2007) has listed four bimagic cubes, two trimagic cubes, and two tetramagic cubes. Two more bimagic cubes (of the same order as those of Hendricks, but differently arranged) were found by Zhong Ming, a mathematics teacher in China. Several of these are perfect magic cubes, and remain perfect after taking powers.

A mod-9 symmetric semiperfect tetramagic cube was found by Emlyn Ellis Addison in 2011.

== Magic cubes based on Dürer's and Gaudi Magic squares ==
A magic cube can be built with the constraint of a given magic square appearing on one of its faces, such as with the magic square of Dürer or the magic square of Gaudi.

A 3×3×3×3 magic tesseract with numbers 1 to 81 and magic constant 123, flattened for viewing in 2D. Each three shaded numbers of a colour denotes an axis perpendicular to the others. Each 3×3 block is a magic square, and each row or column of blocks is a flattened magic cube.

== See also ==
- John R. Hendricks
- Magic cube classes
- Magic hypercube
- Magic series
- Magic square
- Multimagic cube
- Nasik magic hypercube
- Perfect magic cube
- Semiperfect magic cube
