= Magic constant =

Constant used in a magic square

The magic constant or magic sum of a magic square is the sum of numbers in any row, column, or diagonal of the magic square. For example, the magic square shown below has a magic constant of 15. For a normal magic square of order n – that is, a magic square which contains the numbers 1, 2, ..., n^{2} – the magic constant is $M = n \cdot \frac{n^2 + 1}{2}$.

For normal magic squares of orders n = 3, 4, 5, 6, 7, and 8, the magic constants are, respectively: 15, 34, 65, 111, 175, and 260 (sequence A006003 in the OEIS). For example, a normal 8 × 8 square will always equate to 260 for each row, column, or diagonal. The normal magic constant of order n is (n^{3} + n)/2. The largest magic constant of normal magic square which is also a:

- triangular number is 15 (solve the Diophantine equation x^{2} = y^{3} + 16y + 16, where y is divisible by 4);
- square number is 1 (solve the Diophantine equation x^{2} = y^{3} + 4y, where y is even);
- generalized pentagonal number is 171535 (solve the Diophantine equation x^{2} = y^{3} + 144y + 144, where y is divisible by 12);
- tetrahedral number is 2925.

Note that 0 and 1 are the only normal magic constants of rational order which are also rational squares.

However, there are infinitely many rational triangular numbers, rational generalized pentagonal numbers and rational tetrahedral numbers which are also magic constants of rational order.

The term magic constant or magic sum is similarly applied to other "magic" figures such as magic stars and magic cubes. Number shapes on a triangular grid divided into equal polyiamond areas containing equal sums give polyiamond magic constant.

== Magic stars ==
The magic constant of an n-pointed normal magic star is $M = 4n + 2$.

== Magic series ==
In 2013 Dirk Kinnaes found the magic series polytope. The number of unique sequences that form the magic constant is now known up to $n=1000$.

== Moment of inertia ==
In the mass model, the value in each cell specifies the mass for that cell. This model has two notable properties. First it demonstrates the balanced nature of all magic squares. If such a model is suspended from the central cell the structure balances. (consider the magic sums of the rows/columns .. equal mass at an equal distance balance). The second property that can be calculated is the moment of inertia. Summing the individual moments of inertia (distance squared from the center × the cell value) gives the moment of inertia for the magic square, which depends solely on the order of the square.

== See also ==
- Magic number (physics)
