= 2000 (number) =

← 1999	2000	2001 →
- List of numbers; Integers; ← 0 1k 2k 3k 4k 5k 6k 7k 8k 9k →
- Cardinal: two thousand
- Ordinal: 2000th (two thousandth)
- Factorization: 2^{4} × 5^{3}
- Greek numeral: ,Β´
- Roman numeral: MM, mm
- Unicode symbol(s): MM, mm
- Binary: 11111010000_{2}
- Ternary: 2202002_{3}
- Senary: 13132_{6}
- Octal: 3720_{8}
- Duodecimal: 11A8_{12}
- Hexadecimal: 7D0_{16}
- Armenian: Ս
- Egyptian hieroglyph: 𓆽

2000 (two thousand) is a natural number following 1999 and preceding 2001.

== In mathematics ==
2000 is:

- the highest number expressible using only two unmodified characters in Roman numerals (MM)
- an Achilles number
- smallest four digit eban number
- the sum of all the nban numbers (sequence A008537 in the OEIS)

== Selected numbers in the range 2001–2999 ==
=== 2001 to 2099 ===
==== 2001 ====
2001 = 3 × 23 × 29. It is a sphenic number, and the expansion of 25 in the p-system based on convergents to $\sqrt{2}$. It is the factorial base of 49, and the solution to the postage stamp problem with 7 denominations and 8 stamps.

Demontration of the cellular automaton sequence in stage four. The cells are labeled with a number, indicating when they were added. It contains 57 cells.

In a cellular automaton sequence, the cells are the squares of the standard square grid. Cells are either OFF or ON, and if they are ON they stay ON forever. Each cell holds 8 neighbors, the cells are a knight's move away. Stage 1 contains a single ON cell. A cell is turned ON at stage n + 1 if it has exactly one ON neighbor at stage n. In the cellular automaton, 2001 is the number of ON cells after 22 stages of two-dimensional automaton. The difference from the previous stage is 384.

==== 2002 ====
2002 = 2 × 7 × 11 × 13. It is a palindromic number in decimal, base 76, 90, 142, and 11 other non-trivial bases.

==== 2003 ====
2003 is a Sophie Germain prime. It is the first four digits of 2 tetrated to 5.

==== 2005 ====
2005 = 5 × 401. It is a vertically symmetric number.

==== 2011 ====
2011 is a sexy prime with 2017. It is also the sum of eleven consecutive primes: 2011 = 157 + 163 + 167 + 173 + 179 + 181 + 191 + 193 + 197 + 199 + 211

==== 2015 ====
2015 = 5 × 13 × 31. It is a Lucas–Carmichael number.

==== 2016 ====
2016 = 2^{5} × 3^{2} × 7. It is the second-smallest Erdős–Nicolas number and a triangular number.

==== 2017 ====
2017 is a sexy prime with 2011.

==== 2019 ====
2019 = 3 × 673. It is a semiprime, a square-free number, and a happy number. It is the smallest number that can be represented as the sum of 3 prime squares 6 different ways:

2019 = 7^{2} + 11^{2} + 43^{2} = 7^{2} + 17^{2} + 41^{2} = 13^{2} + 13^{2} + 41^{2} = 11^{2} + 23^{2} + 37^{2} = 17^{2} + 19^{2} + 37^{2} = 23^{2} + 23^{2} + 31^{2}.

If 2019 is divided by 4, it yields a remainder of 3. This is usually written as $2019 \equiv 3\pmod{4}$ meaning that 2019 is congruent to 3 mod 4. In modular arithmetic, every square number is congruent to 0 or 1 mod 4. This yields two cases. Either n = 2k in which case n 2 = 4k 2, or n = 2k + 1, in which case n 2 = 4(k 2 + k) + 1. Therefore every sum of two squares is congruent to 0, 1 or 2 mod 4, which defines that 2019 cannot be expressed as the sum of two squares.

==== 2024 ====
2024 = 2^{3} × 11 × 23. It is a tetrahedral number.

==== 2025 ====
2025 = 45^{2}, square of the sum of the first nine positive integers (and therefore sum of the cubes of the first nine positive integers, by Nicomachus's theorem), centered octagonal number, lowest number with exactly 15 odd divisors. Sum of odd numbers from 1 to 89.

==== 2027 ====
2027 is a super-prime and a safe prime.

==== 2029 ====
2029 is a prime number and a member of the Mian–Chowla sequence.

==== 2031 ====
2031 = 3 × 677. It is a centered pentagonal number.

==== 2035 ====
2035 = 5 × 11 × 37. It is a Wolstenholme number.

==== 2036 ====
2036 = 2^{2} × 509. It is an Eulerian number.

==== 2039 ====
2039 is a Sophie Germain prime and a safe prime.

==== 2047 ====
2047 = 23 × 89 = 2^{11} − 1 and it is the first Mersenne number that is composite for a prime exponent. It is a super-Poulet number, a Woodall number, a decagonal number, and a centered octahedral number.

==== 2048 ====
2048 = 2^{11}.

==== 2053 ====
2053 is a prime number and a star number.

==== 2056 ====
2056 = 2^{3} × 257. It is the magic constant of an n × n normal magic square and the n-queens problem for n = 16.

==== 2063 ====
2063 is a Sophie Germain prime, a safe prime, and a super-prime.

==== 2066 ====
2066 = 2 × 1033. It is a Bell number.

==== 2069 ====
2069 is a Sophie Germain prime.

==== 2080 ====
2080 = 2^{5} × 5 × 13. It is a triangular number.

==== 2081, 2083, 2087, and 2089 ====
2081, 2083, 2087, and 2089 form a prime quadruplet.

2081 is also a super-prime.

==== 2099 ====
2099 is a super-prime, a safe prime, and a highly cototient number.

=== 2100 to 2199 ===
==== 2101 ====
2101 = 11 × 191. It is a centered heptagonal number.

==== 2107 and 2108 ====
2107 and 2108 form a Ruth–Aaron pair under the first definition.

==== 2109 ====
2109 = 3 × 19 × 37. It is a square pyramidal number.

==== 2113 ====
2113 is a Proth prime and a centered square number.

==== 2116 ====
2116 = 46^{2} = 2^{2} × 23^{2}.

==== 2125 ====
2125 = 5^{3} × 17. It is a nonagonal number.

==== 2129 ====
2129 is a Sophie Germain prime.

==== 2141 ====
2141 is a Sophie Germain prime.

==== 2145 ====
2145 = 3 × 5 × 11 × 13. It is a triangular number.

==== 2160 ====
2160 = 2^{4} × 3^{3} × 5. It is a largely composite number.

==== 2176 ====
2176 = 2^{7} × 17. It is a pentagonal pyramidal number and a centered pentagonal number.

==== 2179 ====
2179 is a prime number and a Wedderburn–Etherington number.

==== 2187 ====
2187 = 3^{7}. It is a vampire number and a perfect totient number.

==== 2188 ====
2188 = 2^{2} × 547. It is a Motzkin number.

==== 2199 ====
2199 = 3 × 733. It is a perfect totient number.

=== 2200 to 2299 ===
==== 2201 ====
2201 – only known non-palindromic number whose cube is palindromic; also no known fourth or higher powers are palindromic for non-palindromic numbers

==== 2207 ====
2207 – safe prime, Lucas prime

==== 2208 ====
2208 – Keith number

==== 2209 ====
2209 = 47^{2}, palindromic in base 14 (B3B_{14}), centered octagonal number

==== 2211 ====
2211 – triangular number

==== 2221 ====
2221 – super-prime, happy number

==== 2223 ====
2223 – Kaprekar number

==== 2232 ====
2232 – decagonal number

==== 2245 ====
2245 – centered square number

==== 2254 ====
2254 – member of the Mian–Chowla sequence

==== 2255 ====
2255 – octahedral number

==== 2269 ====
2269 – super-prime, cuban prime

==== 2273 ====
2273 – Sophie Germain prime

==== 2276 ====
2276 _ centered heptagonal number

==== 2278 ====
2278 – triangular number

==== 2281 ====
2281 – star number,

==== 2287 ====
2287 – balanced prime

==== 2299 ====
2299 – member of a Ruth–Aaron pair with 2300 (first definition)

=== 2300 to 2399 ===
==== 2300 ====
2300 – tetrahedral number, member of a Ruth–Aaron pair with 2299 (first definition)

==== 2301 ====
2301 – nonagonal number

==== 2309 ====
2309 – primorial prime, twin prime with 2311, Mertens function zero, highly cototient number

==== 2310 ====
2310 – fifth primorial

==== 2311 ====
2311 – primorial prime, twin prime with 2309

==== 2326 ====
2326 – centered pentagonal number

==== 2328 ====
2328 – sum of the totient function for the first 87 integers, the number of groups of order 128

==== 2331 ====
2331 – centered cube number

==== 2339 ====
2339 – Sophie Germain prime, twin prime with 2341

==== 2341 ====
2341 – super-prime, twin prime with 2339

==== 2346 ====
2346 – triangular number

==== 2351 ====
2351 – Sophie Germain prime, super-prime

==== 2352 ====
2352 – pronic number

==== 2357 ====
2357 – 2357 is the 350th prime number, since it has two prime factorizations. It is the only integer that is both a concatenate prime and a minimal k-primeval prime.

Its digits, 2, 3, 5, and 7, are all prime. It is also the smallest number that uses only once of the four prime decimal digits. This definition is called prime-digit prime.

It is the sum of three, and five consecutive primes: (773 + 787 + 797) and (461 + 463 + 467 + 479 + 487).

The terms ($2^2 + 3^3 + 5^5 + 7^7$), ($2^{19} + 3^{19} + 5^{19} + 7^{19}$), ($2^{1013} + 3^{1013} + 5^{1013} + 7^{1013}$), ($2 \times 3 \times 5 \times 7 + 2 + 3 + 5 + 7$), ($2 \times 3 \times 5 \times 7 - 2 - 3 - 5 - 7$), ($(2+3+5+7) \times 2 \times 3 \times 5 \times 7+2357$), and ($(2+3+5+7) \times 2 \times 3 \times 5 \times 7-2357$) are prime.

2357 appears as the first four digits of the decimal expansion of Copeland–Erdős constant:

$$\sum_{n=1}^\infty p_n 10^{-\left(n + \sum_{k=1}^n \lfloor \log_{10}{p_k} \rfloor \right)} \approx 0.{\color{RedOrange}2\;3\;5\;7}\ 11\;13\;17\;19\;23\;29\;31\;37...$$

Or 2357 is defined as the sequence obtained through the concatenation of the first 4 primes.

This means that 2357 is a Smarandache–Wellin number, specifically the forth one. Since 2357 is prime, it is also the third Smarandache–Wellin prime.

==== 2378 ====
2378 – Pell number

==== 2379 ====
2379 – member of the Mian–Chowla sequence

==== 2381 ====
2381 – super-prime, centered square number

==== 2393 ====
2393 – Sophie Germain prime

==== 2399 ====
2399 – Sophie Germain prime

=== 2400 to 2499 ===
==== 2401 ====
2401 = 49^{2} = 7^{4}, centered octagonal number

==== 2415 ====
2415 – triangular number

==== 2417 ====
2417 – super-prime, balanced prime

==== 2425 ====
2425 – decagonal number

==== 2437 ====
2437 – cuban prime, largest right-truncatable prime in base 5

==== 2447 ====
2447 – safe prime

==== 2450 ====
2450 – pronic number

==== 2458 ====
2458 – centered heptagonal number

==== 2459 ====
2459 – Sophie Germain prime, safe prime

==== 2465 ====
2465 – magic constant of n × n normal magic square and n-queens problem for n = 17, Carmichael number

==== 2470 ====
2470 – square pyramidal number

==== 2477 ====
2477 – super-prime, cousin prime

==== 2481 ====
2481 – centered pentagonal number

==== 2484 ====
2484 – nonagonal number

==== 2485 ====
2485 – triangular number, number of planar partitions of 13

==== 2491 ====
2491 = member of Ruth–Aaron pair with 2492 under second definition

==== 2492 ====
2492 – member of Ruth–Aaron pair with 2491 under second definition

=== 2500 to 2599 ===
- 2510 – member of the Mian–Chowla sequence
- 2513 – member of the Padovan sequence
- 2520 – superior highly composite number; smallest number divisible by numbers 1, 2, 3, 4, 5, 6, 7, 8, 9, 10, and 12; colossally abundant number; Harshad number in several bases. It is also the highest number with more divisors than any number less than double itself (sequence A072938 in the OEIS). Not only it is the 7th (and last) number with more divisors than any number double itself but is also the 7th number that is highly composite and the lowest common multiple of a consecutive set of integers from 1 (sequence A095921 in the OEIS) which is a property the previous number with this pattern of divisors does not have (360). That is, although 360 and 2520 both have more divisors than any number twice themselves, 2520 is the lowest number divisible by both 1 to 9 and 1 to 10, whereas 360 is not the lowest number divisible by 1 to 6 (which 60 is) and is not divisible by 1 to 7 (which 420 is). It is also the 6th and largest highly composite number that is a divisor of every higher highly composite number (sequence A106037 in the OEIS).
- 2521 – star prime, centered square number
- 2530 – Leyland number
- 2543 – Sophie Germain prime, sexy prime with 2549
- 2549 – Sophie Germain prime, super-prime, sexy prime with 2543
- 2550 – pronic number
- 2556 – triangular number
- 2579 – safe prime, palindromic prime in bases 5, 25, and 28: 2579 = 40304_{5} = 434_{25} = 383_{28}
- 2580 – Keith number,
- 2584 – Fibonacci number,

=== 2600 to 2699 ===
- 2600 – tetrahedral number, member of a Ruth–Aaron pair with 2601 (first definition)
- 2601 = 51^{2}, member of a Ruth–Aaron pair with 2600 (first definition)
- 2609 – super-prime
- 2620 – telephone number, amicable number with 2924
- 2625 = a centered octahedral number
- 2626 – decagonal number
- 2628 – triangular number
- 2641 – centered pentagonal number
- 2647 – super-prime, centered heptagonal number
- 2652 – pronic number
- 2665 – centered square number
- 2674 – nonagonal number
- 2677 – balanced prime
- 2680 – number of 11-queens problem solutions
- 2683 – super-prime
- 2689 – Proth prime
- 2693 – Sophie Germain prime
- 2699 – Sophie Germain prime

=== 2700 to 2799 ===
- 2701 – triangular number, super-Poulet number
- 2702 – sum of the totient function for the first 94 integers
- 2707 – strong prime
- 2719 – super-prime, largest known odd number which cannot be expressed in the form x^{2} + y^{2} + 10z^{2} where x, y and z are integers. In 1997 it was conjectured that this is also the largest such odd number. It is now known this is true if the generalized Riemann hypothesis is true.
- 2728 – Kaprekar number
- 2729 – highly cototient number
- 2731 – the only Wagstaff prime with four digits, Jacobsthal prime
- 2736 – octahedral number
- 2741 – Sophie Germain prime, 400th prime number
- 2744 = 14^{3}, palindromic in base 13 (1331_{13})
- 2747 – sum of the first 38 primes
- 2749 – super-prime, cousin prime with 2753
- 2753 – Sophie Germain prime, Proth prime
- 2756 – pronic number
- 2774 – sum of the totient function for the first 95 integers
- 2775 – triangular number
- 2780 – member of the Mian–Chowla sequence
- 2783 – member of a Ruth–Aaron pair with 2784 (first definition)
- 2784 – member of a Ruth–Aaron pair with 2783 (first definition)
- 2791 – cuban prime

=== 2800 to 2899 ===
- 2801 – first base 7 repunit prime
- 2803 – super-prime
- 2806 – centered pentagonal number, sum of the totient function for the first 96 integers
- 2809 = 53^{2}, centered octagonal number
- 2813 – centered square number
- 2819 – Sophie Germain prime, safe prime, sum of seven consecutive primes (383 + 389 + 397 + 401 + 409 + 419 + 421)
- 2821 – Carmichael number
- 2835 – decagonal number
- 2843 – centered heptagonal prime
- 2850 – triangular number
- 2862 – pronic number
- 2870 – square pyramidal number
- 2871 – nonagonal number
- 2872 – tetranacci number
- 2875 – number of lines on a quintic threefold
- 2879 – safe prime
- 2897 – super-prime, Markov prime

=== 2900 to 2999 ===
- 2903 – Sophie Germain prime, safe prime, balanced prime
- 2909 – super-prime
- 2915 – Lucas–Carmichael number
- 2924 – amicable number with 2620
- 2925 – magic constant of n × n normal magic square and n-queens problem for n = 18, tetrahedral number, member of the Mian-Chowla sequence
- 2926 – triangular number
- 2939 – Sophie Germain prime
- 2963 – Sophie Germain prime, safe prime, balanced prime
- 2965 – greater of second pair of Smith brothers, centered square number
- 2969 – Sophie Germain prime
- 2970 – harmonic divisor number, pronic number
- 2976 – centered pentagonal number
- 2999 – safe prime

=== Prime numbers ===
There are 127 prime numbers between 2000 and 3000:

2003, 2011, 2017, 2027, 2029, 2039, 2053, 2063, 2069, 2081, 2083, 2087, 2089, 2099, 2111, 2113, 2129, 2131, 2137, 2141, 2143, 2153, 2161, 2179, 2203, 2207, 2213, 2221, 2237, 2239, 2243, 2251, 2267, 2269, 2273, 2281, 2287, 2293, 2297, 2309, 2311, 2333, 2339, 2341, 2347, 2351, 2357, 2371, 2377, 2381, 2383, 2389, 2393, 2399, 2411, 2417, 2423, 2437, 2441, 2447, 2459, 2467, 2473, 2477, 2503, 2521, 2531, 2539, 2543, 2549, 2551, 2557, 2579, 2591, 2593, 2609, 2617, 2621, 2633, 2647, 2657, 2659, 2663, 2671, 2677, 2683, 2687, 2689, 2693, 2699, 2707, 2711, 2713, 2719, 2729, 2731, 2741, 2749, 2753, 2767, 2777, 2789, 2791, 2797, 2801, 2803, 2819, 2833, 2837, 2843, 2851, 2857, 2861, 2879, 2887, 2897, 2903, 2909, 2917, 2927, 2939, 2953, 2957, 2963, 2969, 2971, 2999
