= Disjunctive =

Disjunctive can refer to:

- Disjunctive population, in population ecology, a group of plants or animals disconnected from the rest of its range
- Disjunctive pronoun
- Disjunctive set
- Disjunctive sequence
- Logical disjunction

== See also ==
- Disjoint (disambiguation)
- Disjunct (disambiguation)
