= 2521 (disambiguation) =

2521 commonly refers to Twenty-Five Twenty-One (Korean: 스물다섯 스물하나, romanized: Seumuldaseot Seumulhana) is a 2022 South Korean TV drama

2521, 25/21, 25-21, may also refer to:

- 2521 (number), a number in the 2000s range
  - A star number
- 2521, a year in the 3rd millennium
- 2521 BC, a year in the 3rd millennium Before the Common Era

== Places ==
- 2521 Heidi, asteroid #2521, a main-belt asteroid
- Farm to Market Road 2521 (highway 2521), Texas, USA

== Other uses ==
- German submarine U-2521, a World War II Type XXI U-boat
- Matthew 25:21, a passage in the Christian Bible

== See also ==
- 2520 (number)
