= Normal number =

Number with all digits equally frequent

In mathematics, a real number is said to be simply normal in an integer base b (Note: The only bases considered here are natural numbers greater than 1) if its infinite sequence of digits is distributed uniformly in the sense that each of the b digit values has the same natural density 1/b. A number is said to be normal in base b if, for every positive integer n, all possible strings n digits long have density b^{−n}.

Intuitively, a number being simply normal means that no digit occurs more frequently than any other. If a number is normal, no finite combination of digits of a given length occurs more frequently than any other combination of the same length. A normal number can be thought of as an infinite sequence of coin flips (binary) or rolls of a die (base 6). Even though there will be sequences such as 10, 100, or more consecutive tails (binary) or fives (base 6) or even 10, 100, or more repetitions of a sequence such as tail-head (two consecutive coin flips) or 6-1 (two consecutive rolls of a die), there will also be equally many of any other sequence of equal length. No digit or sequence is "favored".

A number is said to be normal (sometimes called absolutely normal) if it is normal in all integer bases greater than or equal to 2.

While a general proof can be given that almost all real numbers are normal (meaning that the set of non-normal numbers has Lebesgue measure zero), this proof is not constructive, and only a few specific numbers have been shown to be normal. For example, any Chaitin's constant is normal (and uncomputable). It is widely believed that the (computable) numbers √2, π, and e are normal, but a proof remains elusive.

== Definitions ==
Let Σ be a finite alphabet of b-digits, Σ^{ω} the set of all infinite sequences that may be drawn from that alphabet, and Σ^{∗} the set of finite sequences, or strings. (Note: ω is the smallest infinite ordinal number; ^{∗} is the Kleene star.) Let S ∈ Σ^{ω} be such a sequence. For each a in Σ let N_{S}(a, n) denote the number of times the digit a appears in the first n digits of the sequence S. We say that S is simply normal if the limit

$$\lim_{n\to\infty} \frac{N_S(a,n)}{n} = \frac{1}{b}$$

for each a. Now let w be any finite string in Σ^{∗} and let N_{S}(w, n) be the number of times the string w appears as a substring in the first n digits of the sequence S. (For instance, if S = 01010101..., then N_{S}(010, 8) = 3.) S is normal if, for all finite strings w ∈ Σ^{∗},

$$\lim_{n\to\infty} \frac{N_S(w,n)}{n} = \frac{1}{b^{|w|}}$$

where |w| denotes the length of the string w. In other words, S is normal if all strings of equal length occur with equal asymptotic frequency. For example, in a normal binary sequence (a sequence over the alphabet {0,1}), 0 and 1 each occur with frequency 1/2; 00, 01, 10, and 11 each occur with frequency 1/4; 000, 001, 010, 011, 100, 101, 110, and 111 each occur with frequency 1/8; etc. Roughly speaking, the probability of finding the string w in any given position in S is precisely that expected if the sequence had been produced at random.

Suppose now that b is an integer greater than 1 and x is a real number. Consider the infinite digit sequence expansion S_{x, b} of x in the base b positional number system (we ignore the decimal point). We say that x is simply normal in base b if the sequence S_{x, b} is simply normal and that x is normal in base b if the sequence S_{x, b} is normal. The number x is called a normal number (or sometimes an absolutely normal number) if it is normal in base b for every integer b greater than 1.

A given infinite sequence is either normal or not normal, whereas a real number, having a different base-b expansion for each integer b ≥ 2, may be normal in one base but not in another (in which case it is not a normal number). For bases r and s with log r / log s rational (so that r = b^{m} and s = b^{n}) every number normal in base r is normal in base s. For bases r and s with log r / log s irrational, there are uncountably many numbers normal in each base but not the other.

A disjunctive sequence is a sequence in which every finite string appears. A normal sequence is disjunctive, but a disjunctive sequence need not be normal. A rich number in base b is one whose expansion in base b is disjunctive: one that is disjunctive to every base is called absolutely disjunctive or is said to be a lexicon. A number normal in base b is rich in base b, but not necessarily conversely. The real number x is rich in base b if and only if the set {x b^{n} mod 1 : n ∈ N} is dense in the unit interval. (Note: x b^{n} mod 1 denotes the fractional part of x b^{n}.)

We defined a number to be simply normal in base b if each individual digit appears with frequency 1/b. For a given base b, a number can be simply normal (but not normal or rich), rich (but not simply normal or normal), normal (and thus simply normal and rich), or none of these. A number is absolutely non-normal or absolutely abnormal if it is not simply normal in any base.

== Properties and examples ==
The concept of a normal number was introduced by Émile Borel (1909). Using the Borel–Cantelli lemma, he proved that almost all real numbers are normal, establishing the existence of normal numbers. Wacław Sierpiński (1917) showed that it is possible to specify a particular such number. Becher and Figueira (2002) proved that there is a computable absolutely normal number. Although this construction does not directly give the digits of the numbers constructed, it shows that it is possible in principle to enumerate each digit of a particular normal number.

The set of non-normal numbers, despite being "large" in the sense of being uncountable, is also a null set (as its Lebesgue measure as a subset of the real numbers is zero, so it essentially takes up no space within the real numbers). Also, the non-normal numbers (as well as the normal numbers) are dense in the reals: the set of non-normal numbers between two distinct real numbers is non-empty since it contains every rational number (in fact, it is uncountably infinite and even comeagre). For instance, there are uncountably many numbers whose decimal expansions (in base 3 or higher) do not contain the digit 1, and none of those numbers are normal.

Champernowne's constant

0.1234567891011121314151617181920212223242526272829...,

obtained by concatenating the decimal representations of the natural numbers in order, is normal in base 10. Likewise, the different variants of Champernowne's constant (done by performing the same concatenation in other bases) are normal in their respective bases (for example, the base-2 Champernowne constant is normal in base 2), but they have not been proven to be normal in other bases.

The Copeland–Erdős constant

0.23571113171923293137414347535961677173798389...,

obtained by concatenating the prime numbers in base 10, is normal in base 10, as proved by A. H. Copeland and Paul Erdős (1946). More generally, the latter authors proved that the real number represented in base b by the concatenation

0.f(1)f(2)f(3)...,

where f(n) is the n-th prime expressed in base b, is normal in base b. Besicovitch (1935) proved that the number represented by the same expression, with f(n) = n^{2},

0.149162536496481100121144...,

obtained by concatenating the square numbers in base 10, is normal in base 10. Harold Davenport and Erdős (1952) proved that the number represented by the same expression, with f being any non-constant polynomial whose values on the positive integers are positive integers, expressed in base 10, is normal in base 10.

Nakai and Shiokawa (1992) proved that if f(x) is any non-constant polynomial with real coefficients such that f(x) > 0 for all x > 0, then the real number represented by the concatenation

0.[f(1)][f(2)][f(3)]...,

where [f(n)] is the integer part of f(n) expressed in base b, is normal in base b. (This result includes as special cases all of the above-mentioned results of Champernowne, Besicovitch, and Davenport & Erdős.) The authors also show that the same result holds even more generally when f is any function of the form

f(x) = α·x^{β} + α_{1}·x^{β_{1}} + ... + α_{d}·x^{β_{d}},

where the αs and βs are real numbers with β > β_{1} > β_{2} > ... > β_{d} ≥ 0, and f(x) > 0 for all x > 0.

Bailey and Crandall (2002) show an explicit uncountably infinite class of b-normal numbers by perturbing Stoneham numbers.

=== Borel's normality conjecture ===
It has been an elusive goal to prove the normality of numbers that are not artificially constructed. While √2, π, ln(2), and e are strongly conjectured to be normal, it is still not known whether they are normal or not. It has not even been proven that all digits actually occur infinitely many times in the decimal expansions of those constants (for example, in the case of π, the popular claim "every string of numbers eventually occurs in π" is not known to be true). It has also been conjectured that every irrational algebraic number is absolutely normal (which would imply that √2 is normal), and no counterexamples are known in any base. However, no irrational algebraic number has been proven to be normal in any base.

Borel discussed the question in a 1950 note on the decimal digits of √2. He conjectured there that the base-b expansion of an irrational algebraic number satisfies the same laws as that of almost every real number, in particular, that every irrational algebraic number is normal to every base. He then closed by calling the question of whether the digits of a number such as √2 satisfy all the laws that can be stated for randomly chosen digits "one of the most important problems facing mathematicians". This was the first publication to address the expansion of an irrational algebraic number, and the conjecture carries Borel's name.

=== Non-normal numbers ===
No rational number is normal in any base, since the digit sequence of a rational number is eventually periodic, and thus most of the strings that are longer than the period do not appear in the digit sequence. (Note: It is trivial though to construct rational numbers that are simply normal in a given base b. For example, 0.010101... in base 2 is simply normal, since 0 and 1 occur with the same frequency.)

Martin (2001) gives an example of an irrational number that is absolutely abnormal. Let

$$f\left(n\right) = \begin{cases}
n^\frac{f\left(n-1\right)}{n-1}, & n\in\mathbb{Z}\cap\left[3,\infty\right) \\
4, & n = 2
\end{cases}$$

$$\begin{align} & \alpha = \prod_{m=2}^\infty \left({1 - \frac{1}{f\left(m\right)}}\right) = \left(1-\frac{1}{4}\right)\left(1-\frac{1}{9}\right)\left(1-\frac{1}{64}\right)\left(1-\frac{1}{152587890625}\right)\left(1-\frac 1{6^{\left(5^{15}\right)}}\right)\ldots = \\ &=0.6562499999956991\underbrace{99999\ldots99999}_{23,747,291,559}8528404201690728\ldots\end{align}$$

Then the number α is not normal in any base. α is also a Liouville number.

=== Properties ===
Additional properties of normal numbers include:

- Every non-zero real number is the product of two normal numbers. This follows from the general fact that every number is the product of two numbers from a set $X\subseteq\R^+$ if the complement of X has measure 0.
- If x is normal in base b, and a ≠ 0 is a rational number, then $x \cdot a$ is also normal in base b.
- If $A\subseteq\N$ is dense (for every $\alpha<1$ and for all sufficiently large n, $|A \cap \{1,\ldots,n\}| \geq n^\alpha$), and $a_1,a_2,a_3,\ldots$ are the base-b expansions of the elements of A, then the number $0.a_1a_2a_3\ldots$, formed by concatenating the elements of A, is normal in base b (Copeland and Erdős 1946). From this it follows that Champernowne's number is normal in base 10 (since the set of all positive integers is obviously dense) and that the Copeland–Erdős constant is normal in base 10 (since the prime number theorem implies that the set of primes is dense).
- A sequence is normal if and only if every block of equal length appears with equal frequency. (A block of length k is a substring of length k appearing at a position in the sequence that is a multiple of k: e.g. the first length-k block in S is S[1..k], the second length-k block is S[k+1..2k], etc.) This was implicit in the work of Ziv and Lempel (1978) and made explicit in the work of Bourke, Hitchcock, and Vinodchandran (2005).
- A number is normal in base b if and only if it is simply normal in base b^{k} for all $k\in\mathbb{Z}^{+}$. This follows from the previous block characterization of normality: Since the n-th block of length k in its base b expansion corresponds to the n-th digit in its base b^{k} expansion, a number is simply normal in base b^{k} if and only if blocks of length k appear in its base b expansion with equal frequency.
- A number is normal if and only if it is simply normal in every base. This follows from the previous characterization of base b normality.
- A number is b-normal if and only if there exists a set of positive integers $m_1<m_2<m_3<\cdots$ where the number is simply normal in bases b^{m} for all $m\in\{m_1,m_2,\ldots\}.$ No finite set suffices to show that the number is b-normal.
- All normal sequences are closed under finite variations: adding, removing, or changing a finite number of digits in any normal sequence leaves it normal. Similarly, if a finite number of digits are added to, removed from, or changed in any simply normal sequence, the new sequence is still simply normal.

== Connection to finite-state machines ==
Agafonov showed an early connection between finite-state machines and normal sequences: every infinite subsequence selected from a normal sequence by a regular language is also normal. In other words, if one runs a finite-state machine on a normal sequence, where each of the finite-state machine's states are labeled either "output" or "no output", and the machine outputs the digit it reads next after entering an "output" state, but does not output the next digit after entering a "no output state", then the sequence it outputs will be normal.

A deeper connection exists with finite-state gamblers (FSGs) and information lossless finite-state compressors (ILFSCs).

- A finite-state gambler (a.k.a. finite-state martingale) is a finite-state machine over a finite alphabet $\Sigma$, each of whose states is labelled with percentages of money to bet on each digit in $\Sigma$. For instance, for an FSG over the binary alphabet $\Sigma = \{0,1\}$, the current state q bets some percentage $q_0 \in [0,1]$ of the gambler's money on the bit 0, and the remaining $q_1 = 1-q_0$ fraction of the gambler's money on the bit 1. The money bet on the digit that comes next in the input (total money times percent bet) is multiplied by $|\Sigma|$, and the rest of the money is lost. After the bit is read, the FSG transitions to the next state according to the input it received. A FSG d succeeds on an infinite sequence S if, starting from $1, it makes unbounded money betting on the sequence; i.e., if
  $$\limsup_{n\to\infty} d(S \upharpoonright n) = \infty,$$
  where $d(S \upharpoonright n)$ is the amount of money the gambler d has after reading the first n digits of S (see limit superior).
- A finite-state compressor is a finite-state machine with output strings labelling its state transitions, including possibly the empty string. (Since one digit is read from the input sequence for each state transition, it is necessary to be able to output the empty string in order to achieve any compression at all). An information lossless finite-state compressor is a finite-state compressor whose input can be uniquely recovered from its output and final state. In other words, for a finite-state compressor C with state set Q, C is information lossless if the function $f: \Sigma^* \to \Sigma^* \times Q$, mapping the input string of C to the output string and final state of C, is 1–1. Compression techniques such as Huffman coding or Shannon–Fano coding can be implemented with ILFSCs. An ILFSC C compresses an infinite sequence S if
  $$\liminf_{n\to\infty} \frac{|C(S \upharpoonright n)|}{n} < 1,$$
  where $|C(S \upharpoonright n)|$ is the number of digits output by C after reading the first n digits of S. The compression ratio (the limit inferior above) can always be made to equal 1 by the 1-state ILFSC that simply copies its input to the output.

Schnorr and Stimm showed that no FSG can succeed on any normal sequence, and Bourke, Hitchcock and Vinodchandran showed the converse. Therefore:

A sequence is normal if and only if there is no finite-state gambler that succeeds on it.

Ziv and Lempel showed:

A sequence is normal if and only if it is incompressible by any information lossless finite-state compressor

(they actually showed that the sequence's optimal compression ratio over all ILFSCs is exactly its entropy rate, a quantitative measure of its deviation from normality, which is 1 exactly when the sequence is normal). Since the LZ compression algorithm compresses asymptotically as well as any ILFSC, this means that the LZ compression algorithm can compress any non-normal sequence.

These characterizations of normal sequences can be interpreted to mean that "normal" = "finite-state random"; i.e., the normal sequences are precisely those that appear random to any finite-state machine. Compare this with the algorithmically random sequences, which are those infinite sequences that appear random to any algorithm (and in fact have similar gambling and compression characterizations with Turing machines replacing finite-state machines).

== Connection to equidistributed sequences ==
A number x is normal in base b if and only if the sequence ${\left( b^k x \right) }_{k=0}^\infty$ is equidistributed modulo 1, or equivalently, using Weyl's criterion, if and only if

$$\lim_{n\rightarrow\infty}\frac{1}{n}\sum_{k=0}^{n-1}e^{2 \pi i m b^k x}=0 \quad\text{ for all integers } m\geq 1.$$

This connection leads to the terminology that x is normal in base β for any real number β if and only if the sequence $\left({x \beta^k}\right)_{k=0}^\infty$ is equidistributed modulo 1.

== See also ==
- Champernowne constant
- De Bruijn sequence
- Infinite monkey theorem
- The Library of Babel
