= Limit inferior and limit superior =

Bounds of a sequence

In mathematics, the limit inferior and limit superior (or limes inferior and limes superior) of a sequence can be thought of as limiting (that is, eventual and extreme) bounds on the sequence. They can be thought of in a similar fashion for a function (see limit of a function). For a set, they are the infimum and supremum of the set's limit points, respectively. In general, when there are multiple objects around which a sequence, function, or set accumulates, the inferior and superior limits extract the smallest and largest of them; the type of object and the measure of size is context-dependent, but the notion of extreme limits is invariant. Limit inferior is also called infimum limit, limit infimum, liminf, inferior limit, lower limit, or inner limit; limit superior is also known as supremum limit, limit supremum, limsup, superior limit, upper limit, or outer limit.

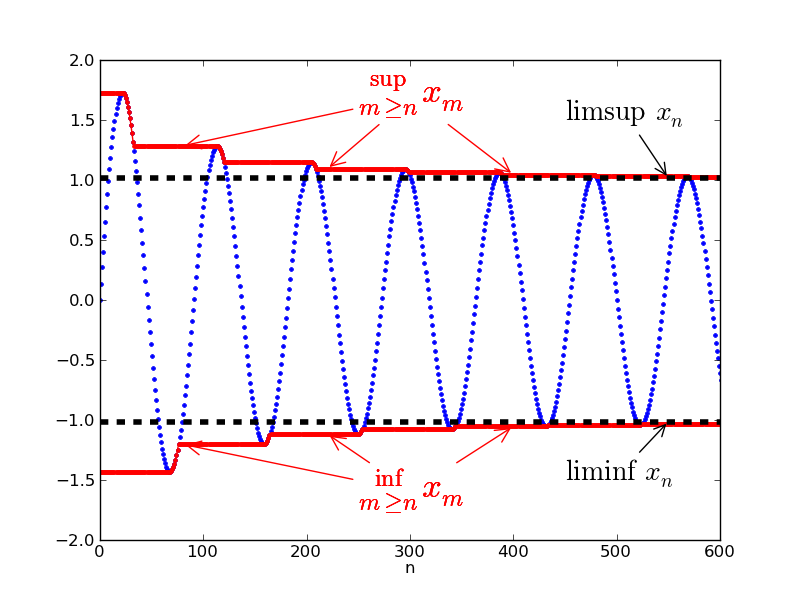
An illustration of limit superior and limit inferior. The sequence x_{n} is shown in blue. The two red curves approach the limit superior and limit inferior of x_{n}, shown as dashed black lines. In this case, the sequence accumulates around the two limits. The superior limit is the larger of the two, and the inferior limit is the smaller. The inferior and superior limits agree if and only if the sequence is convergent (i.e., when there is a single limit).

The limit inferior of a sequence $(x_n)$ is denoted by
$$\liminf_{n\to\infty}x_n\quad\text{or}\quad \varliminf_{n\to\infty}x_n,$$
and the limit superior of a sequence $(x_n)$ is denoted by
$$\limsup_{n\to\infty}x_n\quad\text{or}\quad \varlimsup_{n\to\infty}x_n.$$

== Definition for sequences ==
The limit inferior of a sequence $(x_n)$ is defined by
$$\liminf_{n\to\infty} x_n := \lim_{n\to\infty}\! \Big(\inf_{m \geq n} x_m\Big)$$
or
$$\liminf_{n\to\infty} x_n := \sup_{n \geq 0}\,\inf_{m \geq n} x_m = \sup\,\{\, \inf\,\{\,x_m : m \geq n\,\} : n \geq 0\,\}.$$

Similarly, the limit superior of $(x_n)$ is defined by
$$\limsup_{n\to\infty} x_n := \lim_{n\to\infty}\! \Big(\sup_{m \geq n} x_m\Big)$$
or
$$\limsup_{n\to\infty} x_n := \inf_{n \geq 0}\,\sup_{m \geq n} x_m = \inf\,\{\, \sup\,\{\,x_m : m \geq n\,\} : n \geq 0\,\}.$$

Alternatively, the notations $\varliminf_{n\to\infty} x_n := \liminf_{n\to\infty} x_n$ and $\varlimsup_{n\to\infty} x_n := \limsup_{n\to\infty} x_n$ are sometimes used.

The limits superior and inferior can equivalently be defined using the concept of subsequential limits of the sequence $(x_n)$. An element $\xi$ of the extended real numbers $\overline{\R}$ is a subsequential limit of $(x_n)$ if there exists a strictly increasing sequence of natural numbers $(n_k)$ such that $\xi=\lim_{k\to\infty} x_{n_k}$. If $E \subseteq \overline{\R}$ is the set of all subsequential limits of $(x_n)$, then

$$\limsup_{n\to\infty} x_n = \sup E$$

and

$$\liminf_{n\to\infty} x_n = \inf E.$$

If the terms in the sequence are real numbers, the limit superior and limit inferior always exist, as the real numbers together with ±∞ (i.e. the extended real number line) are complete. More generally, these definitions make sense in any partially ordered set, provided the suprema and infima exist, such as in a complete lattice.

Whenever the ordinary limit exists, the limit inferior and limit superior are both equal to it; therefore, each can be considered a generalization of the ordinary limit which is primarily interesting in cases where the limit does not exist. In general,

$$\liminf_{n\to\infty}x_n \leq \limsup_{n\to\infty}x_n.$$

The limits inferior and superior are related to big-O notation in that they bound a sequence only "in the limit"; the sequence may exceed the bound. However, with big-O notation the sequence can only exceed the bound in a finite prefix of the sequence, whereas the limit superior of a sequence like e^{−n} may actually be less than all elements of the sequence. The only promise made is that some tail of the sequence can be bounded above by the limit superior plus an arbitrarily small positive constant, and bounded below by the limit inferior minus an arbitrarily small positive constant.

The limit superior and limit inferior of a sequence are a special case of those of a function (see below).

== The case of sequences of real numbers ==
In mathematical analysis, limit superior and limit inferior are important tools for studying sequences of real numbers. Since the supremum and infimum of an unbounded set of real numbers may not exist (the reals are not a complete lattice), it is convenient to consider sequences in the affinely extended real number system: we add the positive and negative infinities to the real line to give the complete totally ordered set [−∞,∞], which is a complete lattice.

=== Interpretation ===
Consider a sequence $(x_n)$ consisting of real numbers. Assume that the limit superior and limit inferior are real numbers (so, not infinite).

- The limit superior of $x_n$ is the smallest real number $b$ such that, for any positive real number $\varepsilon$, there exists a natural number $N$ such that $x_n<b+\varepsilon$ for all $n>N$. In other words, any number larger than the limit superior is an eventual upper bound for the sequence. Only a finite number of elements of the sequence are greater than $b+\varepsilon$.
- The limit inferior of $x_n$ is the largest real number $b$ such that, for any positive real number $\varepsilon$, there exists a natural number $N$ such that $x_n>b-\varepsilon$ for all $n>N$. In other words, any number below the limit inferior is an eventual lower bound for the sequence. Only a finite number of elements of the sequence are less than $b-\varepsilon$.

=== Properties ===
In case the sequence is bounded, for all $\epsilon > 0$ almost all sequence members lie in the open interval $(\liminf_{n\to\infty} x_n - \epsilon,\limsup_{n\to\infty} x_n + \epsilon).$

The relationship of limit inferior and limit superior for sequences of real numbers is as follows:
$$\limsup_{n\to\infty} \left(-x_n\right) = -\liminf_{n\to\infty} x_n$$

As mentioned earlier, it is convenient to extend $\R$ to $[-\infty, \infty].$ Then, $\left(x_n\right)$ in $[-\infty, \infty]$ converges if and only if
$$\liminf_{n\to\infty} x_n = \limsup_{n\to\infty} x_n$$
in which case $\lim_{n\to\infty} x_n$ is equal to their common value. (Note that when working just in $\R,$ convergence to $-\infty$ or $\infty$ would not be considered as convergence.) Since the limit inferior is at most the limit superior, the following conditions hold
$$\begin{alignat}{4}
\liminf_{n\to\infty} x_n &=   \infty &&\;\;\text{ implies }\;\; \lim_{n\to\infty} x_n = \infty, \\[0.3ex]
\limsup_{n\to\infty} x_n &= - \infty &&\;\;\text{ implies }\;\; \lim_{n\to\infty} x_n = - \infty.
\end{alignat}$$

If $I = \liminf_{n\to\infty} x_n$ and $S = \limsup_{n\to\infty} x_n$, then the interval $[I, S]$ need not contain any of the numbers $x_n,$ but every slight enlargement $[I - \epsilon, S + \epsilon],$ for arbitrarily small $\epsilon > 0,$ will contain $x_n$ for all but finitely many indices $n.$ In fact, the interval $[I, S]$ is the smallest closed interval with this property. We can formalize this property like this: there exist subsequences $x_{k_n}$ and $x_{h_n}$ of $x_n$ (where $k_n$ and $h_n$ are increasing) for which we have
$$\liminf_{n\to\infty} x_n + \epsilon>x_{h_n} \;\;\;\;\;\;\;\;\; x_{k_n} > \limsup_{n\to\infty} x_n - \epsilon$$

On the other hand, there exists a $n_0\in\mathbb{N}$ so that for all $n \geq n_0$
$$\liminf_{n\to\infty} x_n - \epsilon < x_n < \limsup_{n\to\infty} x_n + \epsilon$$

To recapitulate:

- If $\Lambda$ is greater than the limit superior, there are at most finitely many $x_n$ greater than $\Lambda;$ if it is less, there are infinitely many.
- If $\lambda$ is less than the limit inferior, there are at most finitely many $x_n$ less than $\lambda;$ if it is greater, there are infinitely many.

Conversely, it can also be shown that:

- If there are infinitely many $x_n$ greater than or equal to $\Lambda$, then $\Lambda$ is lesser than or equal to the limit supremum; if there are only finitely many $x_n$ greater than $\Lambda$, then $\Lambda$ is greater than or equal to the limit supremum.
- If there are infinitely many $x_n$ lesser than or equal to $\lambda$, then $\lambda$ is greater than or equal to the limit inferior; if there are only finitely many $x_n$ lesser than $\lambda$, then $\lambda$ is lesser than or equal to the limit inferior.

In general,
$$\inf_n x_n \leq \liminf_{n\to\infty} x_n \leq \limsup_{n\to\infty} x_n \leq \sup_n x_n.$$
The liminf and limsup of a sequence are respectively the smallest and greatest cluster points.

- For any two sequences of real numbers $(a_n), (b_n),$ the limit superior satisfies subadditivity whenever the right side of the inequality is defined (that is, not $\infty - \infty$ or $-\infty + \infty$):
  $$\limsup_{n\to\infty}\, (a_n + b_n) \leq \limsup_{n\to\infty} a_n +\ \limsup_{n\to\infty} b_n.$$

Analogously, the limit inferior satisfies superadditivity:
$$\liminf_{n\to\infty}\, (a_n + b_n) \geq \liminf_{n\to\infty} a_n +\ \liminf_{n\to\infty} b_n.$$
In the particular case that one of the sequences actually converges, say $a_n \to a,$ then the inequalities above become equalities (with $\limsup_{n\to\infty} a_n$ or $\liminf_{n\to\infty} a_n$ being replaced by $a$).

- For any two sequences of non-negative real numbers $(a_n), (b_n),$ the inequalities
  $$\limsup_{n\to\infty}\, (a_n b_n) \leq \left(\limsup_{n\to\infty} a_n \!\right) \!\!\left(\limsup_{n\to\infty} b_n \!\right)$$
  and
  $$\liminf_{n\to\infty}\, (a_n b_n) \geq \left(\liminf_{n\to\infty} a_n \right)\!\!\left(\liminf_{n\to\infty} b_n\right)$$

hold whenever the right-hand side is not of the form $0 \cdot \infty.$

If $\lim_{n\to\infty} a_n = A$ exists (including the case $A = +\infty$) and $B = \limsup_{n\to\infty} b_n,$ then $\limsup_{n\to\infty} \left(a_n b_n\right) = A B$ provided that $A B$ is not of the form $0 \cdot \infty.$

==== Examples ====
- As an example, consider the sequence given by the sine function: $x_n = \sin(n).$ Using the fact that π is irrational, it follows that
  $$\liminf_{n\to\infty} x_n = -1$$
  and
  $$\limsup_{n\to\infty} x_n = +1.$$
  (This is because the sequence $\{1, 2, 3, \ldots\}$ is equidistributed mod 2π, a consequence of the equidistribution theorem.)
- An example from number theory is
  $$\liminf_{n\to\infty}\, (p_{n+1} - p_n),$$
  where $p_n$ is the $n$-th prime number.
  The value of this limit inferior is conjectured to be 2 – this is the twin prime conjecture – but as of April 2014 has only been proven to be less than or equal to 246. The corresponding limit superior is $+\infty$, because there are arbitrarily large gaps between consecutive primes.

== Real-valued functions ==
Assume that a function is defined from a subset of the real numbers to the real numbers. As in the case for sequences, the limit inferior and limit superior are always well-defined if we allow the values +∞ and −∞; in fact, if both agree then the limit exists and is equal to their common value (again possibly including the infinities). For example, given $f(x) = \sin(1/x)$, we have $\limsup_{x\to 0} f(x) = 1$ and $\liminf_{x\to 0} f(x) = -1$. The difference between the two is a rough measure of how "wildly" the function oscillates, and in observation of this fact, it is called the oscillation of f at 0. This idea of oscillation is sufficient to, for example, characterize Riemann-integrable functions as continuous except on a set of measure zero. Note that points of nonzero oscillation (i.e., points at which f is "badly behaved") are discontinuities which make up a negligible subset.

The limit superior of a real-valued function defined on an interval containing a point $x_0$ is
$$\limsup_{x\to x_0} f(x) = \inf_{a > 0} \sup f((x_0-a,x_0+a)),$$
and the limit inferior is
$$\liminf_{x\to x_0} f(x) = \sup_{a > 0} \inf f((x_0-a,x_0+a)).$$
Moreover, there are one-sided versions for functions which are defined on intervals having $x_0$ as an endpoint:
$$\limsup_{x\to x_0^+} f(x) = \inf_{a > 0} \sup f((x_0,x_0+a)),$$
$$\limsup_{x\to x_0^-} f(x) = \inf_{a > 0} \sup f((x_0-a,x_0)),$$
$$\liminf_{x\to x_0^+} f(x) = \sup_{a > 0} \inf f((x_0,x_0+a)),$$
$$\liminf_{x\to x_0^-} f(x) = \sup_{a > 0} \inf f((x_0-a,x_0)).$$

== Functions from topological spaces to complete lattices ==
=== Functions from metric spaces ===
There is a notion of limsup and liminf for functions defined on a metric space whose relationship to limits of real-valued functions mirrors that of the relation between the limsup, liminf, and the limit of a real sequence. Take a metric space $X$, a subspace $E$ contained in $X$, and a function $f:E \to \overline{\mathbb{R}}$. Define, for any point $a$ of the closure of $E$,

$$\limsup_{x \to a} f(x) = \lim_{\varepsilon \to 0} \left(\sup\,\{ f(x) : x \in E \cap B(a,\varepsilon)\}\right)$$
and

$$\liminf_{x \to a} f(x) = \lim_{\varepsilon \to 0} \left(\inf\,\{ f(x) : x \in E \cap B(a,\varepsilon) \}\right)$$

where $B(a,\varepsilon)$ denotes the metric ball of radius $\varepsilon$ about $a$.

Note that as ε shrinks, the supremum of the function over the ball is non-increasing (strictly decreasing or remaining the same), so we have

$$\limsup_{x \to a} f(x) = \inf_{\varepsilon > 0} \left(\sup\,\{ f(x) : x \in E \cap B(a,\varepsilon) \}\right)$$
and similarly
$$\liminf_{x \to a} f(x) = \sup_{\varepsilon > 0} \left(\inf\,\{ f(x) : x \in E \cap B(a,\varepsilon)\}\right).$$

The definition of limsup and liminf in a metric spaces can be equivalently reformulated as follows:

- The limit superior of $f(x)$ as $x\to x_0$ is the supremum of $\limsup_{n\to\infty}f(x_n)$ taken over all sequences tending to $x_0$.
- The limit inferior of $f(x)$ as $x\to x_0$ is the infimum of $\liminf_{n\to\infty}f(x_n)$ taken over all sequences tending to $x_0$.

=== Functions from topological spaces ===
This finally motivates the definitions for general topological spaces. Take X, E and a as before, but now let X be a topological space. In this case, we replace metric balls with neighborhoods:

$$\limsup_{x \to a} f(x) = \inf\,\{\, \sup\,\{ f(x) : x \in E \cap U \} : U\ \mathrm{open},\, a \in U \}$$
$$\liminf_{x \to a} f(x) = \sup\,\{\, \inf\,\{ f(x) : x \in E \cap U \} : U\ \mathrm{open},\, a \in U \}$$

(there is a way to write the formula using "lim" using nets and the neighborhood filter). This version is often useful in discussions of semi-continuity which crop up in analysis quite often. An interesting note is that this version subsumes the sequential version by considering sequences as functions from the natural numbers as a topological subspace of the extended real line, into the space (the closure of N in [−∞,∞], the extended real number line, is N ∪ {∞}.)

== Sequences of sets ==
The power set ℘(X) of a set X is a complete lattice that is ordered by set inclusion, and so the supremum and infimum of any set of subsets (in terms of set inclusion) always exist. In particular, every subset Y of X is bounded above by X and below by the empty set ∅ because ∅ ⊆ Y ⊆ X. Hence, it is possible (and sometimes useful) to consider superior and inferior limits of sequences in ℘(X) (i.e., sequences of subsets of X).

There are two common ways to define the limit of sequences of sets. In both cases:

- The sequence accumulates around sets of points rather than single points themselves. That is, because each element of the sequence is itself a set, there exist accumulation sets that are somehow nearby to infinitely many elements of the sequence.
- The supremum/superior/outer limit is a set that joins these accumulation sets together. That is, it is the union of all of the accumulation sets. When ordering by set inclusion, the supremum limit is the least upper bound on the set of accumulation points because it contains each of them. Hence, it is the supremum of the limit points.
- The infimum/inferior/inner limit is a set where all of these accumulation sets meet. That is, it is the intersection of all of the accumulation sets. When ordering by set inclusion, the infimum limit is the greatest lower bound on the set of accumulation points because it is contained in each of them. Hence, it is the infimum of the limit points.
- Because ordering is by set inclusion, then the outer limit will always contain the inner limit (i.e., lim inf X_{n} ⊆ lim sup X_{n}). Hence, when considering the convergence of a sequence of sets, it generally suffices to consider the convergence of the outer limit of that sequence.

The difference between the two definitions involves how the topology (i.e., how to quantify separation) is defined. In fact, the second definition is identical to the first when the discrete metric is used to induce the topology on X.

=== General set convergence ===
A sequence of sets in a metrizable space $X$ approaches a limiting set when the elements of each member of the sequence approach the elements of the limiting set. In particular, if $(X_n)$ is a sequence of subsets of $X,$ then:

- $\limsup X_n,$ which is also called the outer limit, consists of those elements which are limits of points in $X_n$ taken from (countably) infinitely many $n.$ That is, $x \in \limsup X_n$ if and only if there exists a sequence of points $(x_k)$ and a subsequence $(X_{n_k})$ of $(X_n)$ such that $x_k \in X_{n_k}$ and $\lim_{k\to\infty} x_k = x.$
- $\liminf X_n,$ which is also called the inner limit, consists of those elements which are limits of points in $X_n$ for all but finitely many $n$ (that is, cofinitely many $n$). That is, $x \in \liminf X_n$ if and only if there exists a sequence of points $(x_k)$ such that $x_k \in X_k$ and $\lim_{k\to\infty} x_k = x.$

The limit $\lim X_n$ exists if and only if $\liminf X_n$ and $\limsup X_n$ agree, in which case $\lim X_n = \limsup X_n = \liminf X_n.$ The outer and inner limits should not be confused with the set-theoretic limits superior and inferior, as the latter sets are not sensitive to the topological structure of the space.

=== Special case: discrete metric ===
This is the definition used in measure theory and probability. Further discussion and examples from the set-theoretic point of view, as opposed to the topological point of view discussed below, are at set-theoretic limit.

By this definition, a sequence of sets approaches a limiting set when the limiting set includes elements which are in all except finitely many sets of the sequence and does not include elements which are in all except finitely many complements of sets of the sequence. That is, this case specializes the general definition when the topology on set X is induced from the discrete metric.

Specifically, for points x, y ∈ X, the discrete metric is defined by
$$d(x,y) := \begin{cases} 0 &\text{if } x = y,\\ 1 &\text{if } x \neq y, \end{cases}$$
under which a sequence of points (x_{k}) converges to point x ∈ X if and only if x_{k} = x for all but finitely many k. Therefore, if the limit set exists it contains the points and only the points which are in all except finitely many of the sets of the sequence. Since convergence in the discrete metric is the strictest form of convergence (i.e., requires the most), this definition of a limit set is the strictest possible.

If (X_{n}) is a sequence of subsets of X, then the following always exist:

- lim sup X_{n} consists of elements of X which belong to X_{n} for infinitely many n (see countably infinite). That is, x ∈ lim sup X_{n} if and only if there exists a subsequence (X_{n_{k}}) of (X_{n}) such that x ∈ X_{n_{k}} for all k.
- lim inf X_{n} consists of elements of X which belong to X_{n} for all except finitely many n (i.e., for cofinitely many n). That is, x ∈ lim inf X_{n} if and only if there exists some m > 0 such that x ∈ X_{n} for all n > m.

Observe that x ∈ lim sup X_{n} if and only if x ∉ lim inf X_{n}^{c}.

- lim X_{n} exists if and only if lim inf X_{n} and lim sup X_{n} agree, in which case lim X_{n} = lim sup X_{n} = lim inf X_{n}.

In this sense, the sequence has a limit so long as every point in X either appears in all except finitely many X_{n} or appears in all except finitely many X_{n}^{c}.

Using the standard parlance of set theory, set inclusion provides a partial ordering on the collection of all subsets of X that allows set intersection to generate a greatest lower bound and set union to generate a least upper bound. Thus, the infimum or meet of a collection of subsets is the greatest lower bound while the supremum or join is the least upper bound. In this context, the inner limit, lim inf X_{n}, is the largest meeting of tails of the sequence, and the outer limit, lim sup X_{n}, is the smallest joining of tails of the sequence. The following makes this precise.

- Let I_{n} be the meet of the n^{th} tail of the sequence. That is,
  $$\begin{align}I_n
&= \inf\,\{ X_m : m \in \{n, n+1, n+2, \ldots\}\}\\
&= \bigcap_{m=n}^{\infty} X_m = X_n \cap X_{n+1} \cap X_{n+2} \cap \cdots.
\end{align}$$
  The sequence (I_{n}) is non-decreasing (i.e. I_{n} ⊆ I_{n+1}) because each I_{n+1} is the intersection of fewer sets than I_{n}. The least upper bound on this sequence of meets of tails is
  $$\begin{align}
\liminf_{n\to\infty} X_n
&= \sup\,\{ \,\inf\,\{X_m: m \in \{n, n+1, \ldots\}\}: n \in \{1,2,\dots\}\}\\
&= \bigcup_{n=1}^\infty \left({\bigcap_{m=n}^\infty}X_m\right)\!.
\end{align}$$
  So the limit infimum contains all subsets which are lower bounds for all but finitely many sets of the sequence.
- Similarly, let J_{n} be the join of the n^{th} tail of the sequence. That is,
  $$\begin{align}J_n
&= \sup\,\{ X_m : m \in \{n, n+1, n+2, \ldots\}\}\\
&= \bigcup_{m=n}^{\infty} X_m = X_n \cup X_{n+1} \cup X_{n+2} \cup \cdots.
\end{align}$$
  The sequence (J_{n}) is non-increasing (i.e. J_{n} ⊇ J_{n+1}) because each J_{n+1} is the union of fewer sets than J_{n}. The greatest lower bound on this sequence of joins of tails is
  $$\begin{align}
\limsup_{n\to\infty} X_n
&= \inf\,\{ \,\sup\,\{X_m: m \in \{n, n+1, \ldots\}\}: n \in \{1,2,\dots\}\}\\
&= \bigcap_{n=1}^\infty \left({\bigcup_{m=n}^\infty}X_m\right)\!.
\end{align}$$
  So the limit supremum is contained in all subsets which are upper bounds for all but finitely many sets of the sequence.

=== Examples ===
The following are several set convergence examples. They have been broken into sections with respect to the metric used to induce the topology on set X.

Using the discrete metric

- The Borel–Cantelli lemma is an example application of these constructs.

Using either the discrete metric or the Euclidean metric

- Consider the set X = {0,1} and the sequence of subsets:

$$(X_n) = (\{0\},\{1\},\{0\},\{1\},\{0\},\{1\},\dots).$$

The "odd" and "even" elements of this sequence form two subsequences, ({0}, {0}, {0}, ...) and ({1}, {1}, {1}, ...), which have limit points 0 and 1, respectively, and so the outer or superior limit is the set {0,1} of these two points. However, there are no limit points that can be taken from the (X_{n}) sequence as a whole, and so the interior or inferior limit is the empty set { }. That is,
- lim sup X_{n} = {0,1}
- lim inf X_{n} = { }
However, for (Y_{n}) = ({0}, {0}, {0}, ...) and (Z_{n}) = ({1}, {1}, {1}, ...):
- lim sup Y_{n} = lim inf Y_{n} = lim Y_{n} = {0}
- lim sup Z_{n} = lim inf Z_{n} = lim Z_{n} = {1}

- Consider the set X = {50, 20, −100, −25, 0, 1} and the sequence of subsets:

$$(X_n) = (\{50\}, \{20\}, \{-100\}, \{-25\}, \{0\}, \{1\}, \{0\}, \{1\}, \{0\}, \{1\}, \dots).$$

As in the previous two examples,
- lim sup X_{n} = {0,1}
- lim inf X_{n} = { }
That is, the four elements that do not match the pattern do not affect the lim inf and lim sup because there are only finitely many of them. In fact, these elements could be placed anywhere in the sequence. So long as the tails of the sequence are maintained, the outer and inner limits will be unchanged. The related concepts of essential inner and outer limits, which use the essential supremum and essential infimum, provide an important modification that "squashes" countably many (rather than just finitely many) interstitial additions.

Using the Euclidean metric

- Consider the sequence of subsets of rational numbers:

$$(X_n) = ( \{0\}, \{1\}, \{1/2\}, \{1/2\}, \{2/3\}, \{1/3\}, \{3/4\}, \{1/4\}, \dots ).$$

The "odd" and "even" elements of this sequence form two subsequences, ({0}, {1/2}, {2/3}, {3/4}, ...) and ({1}, {1/2}, {1/3}, {1/4}, ...), which have limit points 1 and 0, respectively, and so the outer or superior limit is the set {0,1} of these two points. However, there are no limit points that can be taken from the (X_{n}) sequence as a whole, and so the interior or inferior limit is the empty set { }. So, as in the previous example,
- lim sup X_{n} = {0,1}
- lim inf X_{n} = { }
However, for (Y_{n}) = ({0}, {1/2}, {2/3}, {3/4}, ...) and (Z_{n}) = ({1}, {1/2}, {1/3}, {1/4}, ...):
- lim sup Y_{n} = lim inf Y_{n} = lim Y_{n} = {1}
- lim sup Z_{n} = lim inf Z_{n} = lim Z_{n} = {0}
In each of these four cases, the elements of the limiting sets are not elements of any of the sets from the original sequence.

- The Ω limit (i.e., limit set) of a solution to a dynamic system is the outer limit of solution trajectories of the system. Because trajectories become closer and closer to this limit set, the tails of these trajectories converge to the limit set.

- For example, an LTI system that is the cascade connection of several stable systems with an undamped second-order LTI system (i.e., zero damping ratio) will oscillate endlessly after being perturbed (e.g., an ideal bell after being struck). Hence, if the position and velocity of this system are plotted against each other, trajectories will approach a circle in the state space. This circle, which is the Ω limit set of the system, is the outer limit of solution trajectories of the system. The circle represents the locus of a trajectory corresponding to a pure sinusoidal tone output; that is, the system output approaches/approximates a pure tone.

== Generalized definitions ==
The above definitions are inadequate for many technical applications. In fact, the definitions above are specializations of the following definitions.

=== Definition for a set ===
The limit inferior of a set X ⊆ Y is the infimum of all of the limit points of the set. That is,

$$\liminf X := \inf\,\{ x \in Y : x \text{ is a limit point of } X \}\,$$

Similarly, the limit superior of X is the supremum of all of the limit points of the set. That is,

$$\limsup X := \sup\,\{ x \in Y : x \text{ is a limit point of } X \}\,$$

Note that the set X needs to be defined as a subset of a partially ordered set Y that is also a topological space in order for these definitions to make sense. Moreover, it has to be a complete lattice so that the suprema and infima always exist. In that case every set has a limit superior and a limit inferior. Also note that the limit inferior and the limit superior of a set do not have to be elements of the set.

=== Definition for filter bases ===
Take a topological space X and a filter base B in that space. The set of all cluster points for that filter base is given by

$$\bigcap\, \{ \overline{B}_0 : B_0 \in B \}$$

where $\overline{B}_0$ is the closure of $B_0$. This is clearly a closed set and is similar to the set of limit points of a set. Assume that X is also a partially ordered set. The limit superior of the filter base B is defined as

$$\limsup B := \sup\, \bigcap\, \{ \overline{B}_0 : B_0 \in B \}$$

when that supremum exists. When X has a total order, is a complete lattice and has the order topology,

$$\limsup B = \inf\,\{ \sup B_0 : B_0 \in B \}.$$

Similarly, the limit inferior of the filter base B is defined as

$$\liminf B := \inf\, \bigcap\, \{ \overline{B}_0 : B_0 \in B \}$$

when that infimum exists; if X is totally ordered, is a complete lattice, and has the order topology, then

$$\liminf B = \sup\,\{ \inf B_0 : B_0 \in B \}.$$

If the limit inferior and limit superior agree, then there must be exactly one cluster point and the limit of the filter base is equal to this unique cluster point.

==== Specialization for sequences and nets ====
Note that filter bases are generalizations of nets, which are generalizations of sequences. Therefore, these definitions give the limit inferior and limit superior of any net (and thus any sequence) as well. For example, take topological space $X$ and the net $(x_\alpha)_{\alpha \in A}$, where $(A,{\leq})$ is a directed set and $x_\alpha \in X$ for all $\alpha \in A$. The filter base ("of tails") generated by this net is $B$ defined by

$$B := \{ \{ x_\alpha : \alpha_0 \leq \alpha \} : \alpha_0 \in A \}.\,$$

Therefore, the limit inferior and limit superior of the net are equal to the limit superior and limit inferior of $B$ respectively. Similarly, for topological space $X$, take the sequence $(x_n)$ where $x_n \in X$ for any $n \in \mathbb{N}$. The filter base ("of tails") generated by this sequence is $C$ defined by

$$C := \{ \{ x_n : n_0 \leq n \} : n_0 \in \mathbb{N} \}.\,$$

Therefore, the limit inferior and limit superior of the sequence are equal to the limit superior and limit inferior of $C$ respectively.

== See also ==
- Essential infimum and essential supremum
- Envelope (waves)
- One-sided limit
- Dini derivatives
- Set-theoretic limit
