= Stoneham number =

In mathematics, the Stoneham numbers are a certain class of real numbers, named after mathematician Richard G. Stoneham (1920–1996). For coprime numbers b, c > 1, the Stoneham number α_{b,c} is defined as

$$\alpha_{b,c} = \sum_{n=c^k>1} \frac{1}{b^nn} = \sum_{k=1}^\infty \frac{1}{b^{c^k}c^k}$$

It was shown by Stoneham in 1973 that α_{b,c} is b-normal whenever c is an odd prime and b is a primitive root of c^{2}. In 2002, Bailey & Crandall showed that coprimality of b, c > 1 is sufficient for b-normality of α_{b,c}.
