= Oscillation (mathematics) =

Amount of variation between extrema

Oscillation of a sequence (shown in blue) is the difference between the limit superior and limit inferior of the sequence.

In mathematics, the oscillation of a function or a sequence is a number that quantifies how much that sequence or function varies between its extreme values as it approaches infinity or a point. As is the case with limits, there are several definitions that put the intuitive concept into a form suitable for a mathematical treatment: oscillation of a sequence of real numbers, oscillation of a real-valued function at a point, and oscillation of a function on an interval (or open set).

== Definitions ==
=== Oscillation of a sequence ===
Let $(a_n)$ be a sequence of real numbers. The oscillation $\omega(a_n)$ of that sequence is defined as the difference (possibly infinite) between the limit superior and limit inferior of $(a_n)$:

$$\omega(a_n) = \limsup_{n\to\infty} a_n - \liminf_{n\to\infty} a_n$$.

The oscillation is zero if and only if the sequence converges. It is undefined if $\limsup_{n\to\infty}$ and $\liminf_{n\to\infty}$ are both equal to +∞ or both equal to −∞, that is, if the sequence tends to +∞ or −∞.

=== Oscillation of a function on an open set ===
Let $f$ be a real-valued function of a real variable. The oscillation of $f$ on an interval $I$ in its domain is the difference between the supremum and infimum of $f$:

$$\omega_f(I) = \sup_{x\in I} f(x) - \inf_{x\in I} f(x).$$

More generally, if $f:X\to\mathbb{R}$ is a function on a topological space $X$ (such as a metric space), then the oscillation of $f$ on an open set $U$ is

$$\omega_f(U) = \sup_{x\in U} f(x) - \inf_{x\in U}f(x).$$

=== Oscillation of a function at a point ===
The oscillation of a function $f$ of a real variable at a point $x_0$ is defined as the limit as $\epsilon\to 0$ of the oscillation of $f$ on an $\epsilon$-neighborhood of $x_0$:

$$\omega_f(x_0) = \lim_{\epsilon\to 0} \omega_f(x_0-\epsilon,x_0+\epsilon).$$

This is the same as the difference between the limit superior and limit inferior of the function at $x_0$, provided the point $x_0$ is not excluded from the limits.

More generally, if $f:X\to\mathbb{R}$ is a real-valued function on a metric space, then the oscillation is

$$\omega_f(x_0) = \lim_{\epsilon\to 0} \omega_f(B_\epsilon(x_0)).$$

== Examples ==
sin (1/x) (the topologist's sine curve) has oscillation 2 at x = 0, and 0 elsewhere.

- $\frac {1}{x}$ has oscillation ∞ at $x$ = 0, and oscillation 0 at other finite $x$ and at −∞ and +∞.
- $\sin \frac {1}{x}$ (the topologist's sine curve) has oscillation 2 at $x$ = 0, and 0 elsewhere.
- $\sin x$ has oscillation 0 at every finite $x$, and 2 at −∞ and +∞.
- $(-1)^x$or 1, −1, 1, −1, 1, −1... has oscillation 2.

In the last example the sequence is periodic, and any sequence that is periodic without being constant will have non-zero oscillation. However, non-zero oscillation does not usually indicate periodicity.

Geometrically, the graph of an oscillating function on the real numbers follows some path in the xy-plane, without settling into ever-smaller regions. In well-behaved cases the path might look like a loop coming back on itself, that is, periodic behaviour; in the worst cases quite irregular movement covering a whole region.

== Continuity ==
Oscillation can be used to define continuity of a function, and is easily equivalent to the usual ε-δ definition (in the case of functions defined everywhere on the real line): a function ƒ is continuous at a point x_{0} if and only if the oscillation is zero; in symbols, $\omega_f(x_0) = 0.$ A benefit of this definition is that it quantifies discontinuity: the oscillation gives how much the function is discontinuous at a point.

For example, in the classification of discontinuities:

- in a removable discontinuity, the distance that the value of the function is off by is the oscillation;
- in a jump discontinuity, the size of the jump is the oscillation (assuming that the value at the point lies between these limits from the two sides);
- in an essential discontinuity, oscillation measures the failure of a limit to exist.

This definition is useful in descriptive set theory to study the set of discontinuities and continuous points – the continuous points are the intersection of the sets where the oscillation is less than ε (hence a G_{δ} set) – and gives a very quick proof of one direction of the Lebesgue integrability condition.

The oscillation is equivalent to the ε-δ definition by a simple re-arrangement, and by using a limit (lim sup, lim inf) to define oscillation: if (at a given point) for a given ε_{0} there is no δ that satisfies the ε-δ definition, then the oscillation is at least ε_{0}, and conversely if for every ε there is a desired δ, the oscillation is 0. The oscillation definition can be naturally generalized to maps from a topological space to a metric space.

== Generalizations ==
More generally, if f : X → Y is a function from a topological space X into a metric space Y, then the oscillation of f is defined at each x ∈ X by

$$\omega(x) = \inf\left\{\mathrm{diam}(f(U))\mid U\mathrm{\ is\ a\  neighborhood\ of\ }x\right\}$$

== See also ==
- Wave equation
- Wave envelope
- Grandi's series
- Bounded mean oscillation
