= Smarandache–Wellin number =

Concatenation of the first n prime numbers

In mathematics, a Smarandache–Wellin number is an integer that in a given base is the concatenation of the first n prime numbers written in that base. Smarandache–Wellin numbers are named after Florentin Smarandache and Paul R. Wellin.

The first decimal Smarandache–Wellin numbers are:

2, 23, 235, 2357, 235711, 23571113, 2357111317, 235711131719, 23571113171923, 2357111317192329, ... (sequence A019518 in the OEIS).

== Smarandache–Wellin prime ==
A Smarandache–Wellin number that is also prime is called a Smarandache–Wellin prime. The first three are 2, 23 and 2357 (sequence A069151 in the OEIS). The fourth is 355 digits long: it is the result of concatenating the first 128 prime numbers, through 719.

The primes at the end of the concatenation in the Smarandache–Wellin primes are

2, 3, 7, 719, 1033, 2297, 3037, 11927, ... (sequence A046284 in the OEIS).

The indices of the Smarandache–Wellin primes in the sequence of Smarandache–Wellin numbers are:

1, 2, 4, 128, 174, 342, 435, 1429, ... (sequence A046035 in the OEIS).

The 1429th Smarandache–Wellin number is a prime with 5719 digits ending in 11927, discovered by Eric W. Weisstein as a probable prime in 1998 and then proven prime in 2022. In March 2009, Weisstein's search showed the index of the next Smarandache–Wellin prime (if one exists) is at least 22077.

== See also ==
- Copeland–Erdős constant
- Champernowne constant, another example of a number obtained by concatenating a representation in a given base.
