= Ban number =

Class of numbers not containing a particular letter in English

In recreational mathematics, a ban number is a number that does not contain a particular letter when spelled out in English; in other words, the letter is "banned." Ban numbers are not precisely defined, since some large numbers do not follow the standards of number names (such as googol and googolplex).

There are several published sequences of ban numbers:

- The aban numbers do not contain the letter A. The first few aban numbers are 1 through 999, 1,000,000 through 1,000,999, 2,000,000 through 2,000,999, ... The word "and" is not counted.
- The dban numbers do not contain the letter D. The first few dban numbers are 1 through 99, 1,000,000 through 1,000,099, 2,000,000 through, 2,000,099, etc...
- The eban numbers do not contain the letter E. The first few eban numbers are 2, 4, 6, 30, 32, 34, 36, 40, 42, 44, 46, 50, 52, 54, 56, 60, 62, 64, 66, 2000, 2002, 2004, 2006, 2030, 2032, 2034, 2036, 2040, 2042, 2044, 2046, 2050, 2052, 2054, 2056, 2060, 2062, 2064, 2066... (sequence A006933 in the OEIS). The sequence was coined in 1990 by Neil Sloane. Coincidentally, all the numbers in the sequence are even.
- The iban numbers do not contain the letter I. The first few iban numbers are 1, 2, 3, 4, 7, 10, 11, 12, 14, 17, 20, 21, 22, 23, 24, 27, 40, ... (sequence A089589 in the OEIS). Since all the -illion numbers contain the letter I, there are exactly 30,275 iban numbers, the largest being 777,777.
- The nban numbers do not contain the letter N. The first few nban numbers are 0, 2, 3, 4, 5, 6, 8, 12, 30, 32, 33, 34, 35, 36, 38, 40, 42, 43, 44, 45, 46, 48, ... (sequence A008537 in the OEIS). Since "hundred", "thousand", and all the -illion numbers contain the letter N, there are exactly 43 nban numbers, the largest being 88.
- The oban numbers do not contain the letter O. The first few oban numbers are 3, 5, 6, 7, 8, 9, 10, 11, 12, 13, 15, 16, 17, 18, 19, 20, 23, 25, 26, ... (sequence A008521 in the OEIS). Since "thousand" and all the -illion numbers contain the letter O, there are exactly 454 oban numbers, the largest being 999. Saying the word "o" for numbers with 0 in the tens place is not counted.
- The sban numbers do not contain the letter S. The first few sban numbers are 1, 2, 3, 4, 5, 8, 9, 10, 11, 12, 13, 14, 15, 18, 19, 20, 21, 22, 23, 24, ... (sequence A008539 in the OEIS).
- The tban numbers do not contain the letter T. The first few tban numbers are 1, 4, 5, 6, 7, 9, 11, 100, 101, 104, 105, 106, 107, 109, 111, 400, 401, 404, 405, 406, ... (sequence A008523 in the OEIS).
- The uban numbers do not contain the letter U. The first few uban numbers are 1, 2, 3, 5, 6, 7, 8, 9, 10, 11, 12, 13, 15, 16, 17, 18, 19, 20, 21, 22, 23, 25, 26, ... (sequence A089590 in the OEIS).
- The yban numbers do not contain the letter Y. The first few yban numbers are 1 through 19, 100 through 119, 200 through 219, 300 through 319, ... (sequence A008554 in the OEIS).

== Basic properties ==
=== Aban numbers ===
- For 1<N<10^{9}, aban numbers are numbers which the integer part of N/1000 is divisible by 1000.

=== Eban numbers ===
- Eban numbers are never odd, due to "one", "three", "five", "seven", "nine", "eleven" and the suffix -teen all containing 'e's.
