= Borel–Cantelli lemma =

Theorem in probability theory

The Borel–Cantelli lemma is a result in measure theory. It is often stated in the context of probability theory, where it is used to study whether, in a given sequence of events, a finite or infinite number of these events occur. The statement of the lemma is often split into two parts:

- The first Borel–Cantelli lemma, which states that if the sum of the probabilities of the events is finite, then the probability that infinitely many of them occur is 0. This result holds for any sequence of events, without additional assumptions;
- The second Borel–Cantelli lemma, which states that if the events are independent and the sum of their probabilities is infinite, then the probability that infinitely many of them occur is 1.

It follows that the probability of the limit superior of a sequence of independent events is always either zero or one. For this reason, the Borel–Cantelli lemma is often referred to as a zero-one law. Other examples or similar results include Kolmogorov's zero–one law and the Hewitt–Savage zero–one law.

The Borel–Cantelli lemma is named after Émile Borel and Francesco Paolo Cantelli, who stated it in the first decades of the 20th century.

== Statement of lemma for probability spaces ==
Let E_{1}, E_{2}, ... be a sequence of events in some probability space. The Borel–Cantelli lemma states:

Borel–Cantelli lemma—If the sum of the probabilities of the events {E_{n}} is finite
$$\sum_{n=1}^\infty \Pr(E_n)<\infty,$$
then the probability that infinitely many of them occur is 0, that is,
$$\Pr\left(\limsup_{n\to\infty} E_n\right) = 0.$$

Here, "lim sup" denotes limit supremum of the sequence of events. That is, lim sup E_{n} is the outcome that infinitely many of the infinite sequence of events (E_{n}) actually occur. Explicitly,
$$\limsup_{n\to\infty} E_n = \bigcap_{n=1}^\infty \bigcup_{k = n}^\infty E_k.$$
The set lim sup E_{n} is sometimes denoted {E_{n} i.o.}, where "i.o." stands for "infinitely often". The theorem therefore asserts that if the sum of the probabilities of the events E_{n} is finite, then the set of all outcomes that contain infinitely many events must have probability zero. Note that no assumption of independence is required.

=== Example ===
Suppose (X_{n}) is a sequence of random variables with Pr(X_{n} = 0) = 1/n^{2} for each n. The probability that X_{n} = 0 occurs for infinitely many n is equivalent to the probability of the intersection of infinitely many [X_{n} = 0] events. The intersection of infinitely many such events is a set of outcomes common to all of them. However, the sum ΣPr(X_{n} = 0) converges to π^{2}/6 ≈ 1.645 < ∞, and so the Borel–Cantelli Lemma states that the set of outcomes that are common to infinitely many such events occurs with probability zero. Hence, the probability of X_{n} = 0 occurring for infinitely many n is 0. Almost surely (i.e., with probability 1), X_{n} is nonzero for all but finitely many n.

== Proof ==
Let (E_{n}) be a sequence of events in some probability space.

The sequence of events $\left\{\bigcup_{n=N}^\infty E_n\right\}^\infty_{N=1}$ is non-increasing:
$$\bigcup_{n=1}^\infty E_n \supseteq \bigcup_{n=2}^\infty E_n \supseteq \cdots \supseteq \bigcup_{n=N}^\infty E_n \supseteq \bigcup_{n=N+1}^\infty E_n \supseteq \cdots \supseteq \limsup_{n\to\infty} E_n.$$
By continuity from above,
$$\Pr(\limsup_{n \to \infty} E_n) = \lim_{N\to\infty}\Pr\left(\bigcup_{n=N}^\infty E_n\right).$$
By subadditivity,
$$\Pr\left(\bigcup_{n=N}^\infty E_n\right) \leq \sum^\infty_{n=N} \Pr(E_n).$$
By original assumption, $\sum_{n=1}^\infty \Pr(E_n)<\infty.$ As the series $\sum_{n=1}^\infty \Pr(E_n)$ converges,
$$\lim_{N\to\infty} \sum^\infty_{n=N} \Pr(E_n)=0,$$
as required.

== General measure spaces ==
For general measure spaces, the Borel–Cantelli lemma takes the following form:

Borel–Cantelli Lemma for measure spaces—Let μ be a (positive) measure on a set X, with σ-algebra F, and let (A_{n}) be a sequence in F. If
$$\sum_{n=1}^\infty\mu(A_n)<\infty,$$
then
$$\mu\left(\limsup_{n\to\infty} A_n\right) = 0.$$

== Converse result ==
A related result, sometimes called the second Borel–Cantelli lemma, is a partial converse of the first Borel–Cantelli lemma. The lemma states: If the events E_{n} are independent and the sum of the probabilities of the E_{n} diverges to infinity, then the probability that infinitely many of them occur is 1. That is:

Second Borel–Cantelli Lemma—If $\sum^{\infty}_{n = 1} \Pr(E_n) = \infty$ and the events $(E_n)^{\infty}_{n = 1}$ are independent, then $\Pr(\limsup_{n \to \infty} E_n) = 1.$

The assumption of independence can be weakened to pairwise independence, but in that case the proof is more difficult.

The infinite monkey theorem follows from this second lemma.

=== Example ===
The lemma can be applied to give a covering theorem in R^{n}. Specifically Stein (1993, Lemma X.2.1), if E_{j} is a collection of Lebesgue measurable subsets of a compact set in R^{n} such that
$$\sum_j \mu(E_j) = \infty,$$
then there is a sequence F_{j} of translates
$$F_j = E_j + x_j$$
such that
$$\limsup_{j\to\infty} F_j = \bigcap_{n=1}^\infty \bigcup_{k=n}^\infty F_k = \mathbb{R}^n$$
apart from a set of measure zero.

=== Proof ===
Suppose that $\sum_{n = 1}^\infty \Pr(E_n) = \infty$ and the events $(E_n)^\infty_{n = 1}$ are independent. It is sufficient to show the event that the E_{n}'s did not occur for infinitely many values of n has probability 0. This is just to say that it is sufficient to show that
$$1-\Pr(\limsup_{n \to \infty} E_n) = 0.$$

Noting that:
$$\begin{align}
1 - \Pr(\limsup_{n \to \infty} E_n) &= 1 - \Pr\left(\{E_n\text{ i.o.}\}\right) = \Pr\left(\{E_n \text{ i.o.}\}^c \right) \\
& = \Pr\left(\left(\bigcap_{N=1}^\infty \bigcup_{n=N}^\infty E_n\right)^c \right) = \Pr\left(\bigcup_{N=1}^\infty \bigcap_{n=N}^\infty E_n^c \right)\\
&= \Pr\left(\liminf_{n \to \infty}E_n^{c}\right)= \lim_{N \to \infty}\Pr\left(\bigcap_{n=N}^\infty E_n^c \right),
\end{align}$$
it is enough to show: $\Pr\left(\bigcap_{n=N}^{\infty} E_n^{c}\right) = 0$. Since the $(E_n)^{\infty}_{n = 1}$ are independent:
$$\begin{align}
\Pr\left(\bigcap_{n=N}^\infty E_n^c\right)
&= \prod^\infty_{n=N} \Pr(E_n^c) \\
&= \prod^\infty_{n=N} (1-\Pr(E_n)).
\end{align}$$
The convergence test for infinite products guarantees that the product above is 0, if $\sum_{n = N}^\infty \Pr(E_n)$ diverges. This completes the proof.

== Generalizations ==
=== Renyi–Lamperti lemma ===
The assumption of independence in the second lemma can be relaxed. The Renyi–Lamperti lemma states that if the events $(A_n)$ satisfy $\sum \Pr(A_n) = \infty$ and a condition of weak dependence regarding the correlation of the events, specifically:
$$\liminf_{n\to\infty} \frac{\sum_{1\le i,j \le n} \Pr(A_i\cap A_j)}{\left(\sum_{i=1}^n \Pr(A_i)\right)^2} = 1,$$
then $\Pr(A_n \text{ i.o.}) = 1$.

This result is related to the Kochen–Stone theorem, which provides a lower bound for the probability of infinitely many events occurring when the limit inferior in the condition above is positive but not necessarily 1.

=== Conditional Borel–Cantelli lemma ===
A powerful generalization involving conditional probability is known as the Conditional Borel–Cantelli lemma (or Lévy's extension of the Borel–Cantelli lemma). It connects the occurrence of events to the accumulation of their conditional probabilities given the past.

Let $(\mathcal{F}_n)$ be a filtration on a probability space, and let $E_n \in \mathcal{F}_n$ be a sequence of events adapted to the filtration. Then, almost surely:
$$\left\{ \sum_{n=1}^\infty \Pr(E_n \mid \mathcal{F}_{n-1}) = \infty \right\} = \{ E_n \text{ i.o.} \}.$$
In other words, the event that $E_n$ occurs infinitely often is almost surely equivalent to the event that the sum of the conditional probabilities diverges. This result is a consequence of martingale convergence theorems.

== Counterpart ==
Another related result is the so-called counterpart of the Borel–Cantelli lemma. It is a counterpart of the Lemma in the sense that it gives a necessary and sufficient condition for the limsup to be 1 by replacing the independence assumption by the completely different assumption that $(A_n)$ is monotone increasing for sufficiently large indices. This Lemma says:

Let $(A_n)$ be such that $A_k \subseteq A_{k+1}$, and let $\bar A$ denote the complement of $A$. Then the probability of infinitely many $A_k$ occur (that is, at least one $A_k$ occurs) is one if and only if there exists a strictly increasing sequence of positive integers $( t_k)$ such that
$$\sum_k \Pr( A_{t_{k+1}} \mid \bar A_{t_k}) = \infty.$$
This simple result can be useful in problems such as for instance those involving hitting probabilities for stochastic process with the choice of the sequence $(t_k)$ usually being the essence.

== Kochen–Stone ==
Let $(A_n)$ be a sequence of events with $\sum\Pr(A_n)=\infty$ and $\limsup_{k\to\infty} \frac{\left(\sum_{n=1}^k\Pr(A_n)\right)^2} {\sum_{1\le m,n \le k} \Pr(A_m\cap A_n)} > 0.$ Then there is a positive probability that $A_n$ occur infinitely often.

=== Proof ===
Let $S_{m,n} = \sum^n_{i=m} \mathbf{1}_{A_i}$. Then, note that
$$E[S_{m,n}]^2 = \left(\sum^n_{i=m} \Pr(A_i)\right)^2$$
and
$$E[S_{m,n}^2] = \sum_{1\le i \le j\le n} \Pr(A_i\cap A_j).$$
Hence, we know that $\limsup_{n\to\infty} \frac{\mathbb{E}[S_{1,n}]^2}{\mathbb{E}[S_{1,n}^2]} > 0.$ We have that
$$\Pr\left(\bigcup^n_{i=m} A_i\right) = \Pr(S_{m,n} > 0).$$
Now, notice that by the Cauchy-Schwarz Inequality, for any random variable $X\geq 0$:
$$\mathbb{E}[X]^2 \le \mathbb{E}[X\mathbf{1}_{\{X>0\}}]^2 \le \mathbb{E}[X^2]\Pr(X>0),$$
therefore,
$$\Pr(S_{m,n} > 0) \ge \frac{\mathbb{E}[S_{m,n}]^2}{\mathbb{E}[S_{m,n}^2]}.$$
We then have
$$\frac{\mathbb{E}[S_{m,n}]^2}{\mathbb{E}[S_{m,n}^2]} \ge \frac{E[S_{1,n} - S_{1,m-1}]^2}{E[S_{1,n}^2]}.$$
Given $m$, since $\lim_{n\to\infty} \mathbb{E}[S_{1,n}] = \infty$, we can find $n$ large enough so that
$$\biggr|\frac{\mathbb{E}[S_{1,n}]-\mathbb{E}[S_{1,m-1}]}{\mathbb{E}[S_{1,n}]} - 1\biggr| < \epsilon,$$
for any given $\epsilon > 0$. Therefore,
$$\lim_{m\to\infty}\sup_{n\ge m}\Pr\left(\bigcup_{i=m}^n A_i\right) \ge \lim_{m\to\infty}\sup_{n\ge m}\frac{E[S_{1,n}]^2}{E[S_{1,n}^2]} > 0.$$
But the left side is precisely the probability that the $A_n$ occur infinitely often since $\{A_k \text{ i.o.}\} = \{\omega\in\Omega : \forall m, \exists n\ge m \text{ s.t. } \omega\in A_n\}.$ We're done now, since we've shown that $P(A_k \text{ i.o.}) > 0.$

== Applications ==
=== Strong Law of Large Numbers ===
The Borel–Cantelli lemma is a standard tool used to prove the Strong Law of Large Numbers. In many proofs, Chebyshev's inequality is applied to bound the probability that a sum of random variables deviates from its mean. If these probabilities sum to a finite value (often involving a convergence of $\sum n^{-2}$), the first Borel–Cantelli lemma implies that large deviations occur only finitely often, establishing almost sure convergence.

=== Metric Number Theory ===
The lemma was originally formulated by Émile Borel in the context of number theory to study the properties of normal numbers. It is central to the metric theory of Diophantine approximation. For instance, the Borel–Bernstein theorem uses the lemma to show that for almost all real numbers $x$, the inequality $\left| x - \frac{p}{q} \right| < \frac{1}{q^2 \ln q}$ holds for infinitely many pairs of coprime integers $(p, q)$. Conversely, if the function $\phi(q)$ on the right-hand side is replaced by one where the sum $\sum \phi(q)$ converges, the inequality has only finitely many solutions almost surely.

== See also ==
- Lévy's zero–one law
- Kuratowski convergence
- Infinite monkey theorem
