= Concatenation =

Joining of strings in a programming language

A spreadsheet's concatenate ("&") function is used to assemble a complex text string—in this example, XML code for an SVG "circle" element.

In formal language theory and computer programming, concatenation is the operation of joining sequential objects, such as character strings, files, lists or pieces of audio or video, end-to-end. For example, the concatenation of "snow" and "ball" is "snowball". In certain formalizations of concatenation theory, also called string theory, string concatenation is a primitive notion.

== Terminology ==
To concatenate is to join two or more sequential objects together to create a new object, generally without modifying any of the original objects.

To append is to modify a sequential object by adding material at the end. Thus to append a to b is to modify b to be equal to the concatenation of the original value of b and a. Despite this, in some high-level programming languages, especially functional and logical ones, append is the operation for concatenating lists or arrays without modifying the originals.

To prepend is to modify a sequential object by adding material at the beginning. Thus to prepend a to b is to modify b to be equal to the concatenation of a and the original value of b.

== Syntax ==
In many programming languages, string concatenation is a binary infix operator, and in some it is written without an operator. Furthermore, the notation may be specific to string concatenation or support concatenation of various sequential data types depending on the language. Examples include:

- Overloading the plus sign +, such as most BASICs and C#: "Hello, " + "World" has the value "Hello, World".
- Dedicated operator, such as . in PHP, & in Visual Basic, || in SQL and ~ in D. Advantages over reusing + may include supporting implicit type conversion to strings and distinguishing numeric array/list concatenation from vector addition, depending on the language.
- String literal concatenation, in which adjacent strings are concatenated without any operator. Example from C: "Hello, " "World" has the value "Hello, World".
- Interpolation, using a special syntax to embed variables or expressions within strings. Example from C#: $"{hello}{world}", where string hello = "Hello, "; and string world = "World";
- Formatting, using a string formatter to concatenate. Example from Java: String.format("%s%s", "Hello, ", "World")

In many scientific publications or standards the concatenation operator notation used is ||.

=== Lisp ===
The append function takes zero or more (linked) lists as arguments, and returns the concatenation of these lists.

(append '(1 2 3) '(a b) '() '(6))
;Output: (1 2 3 a b 6)

The append function copies all of its arguments except the last, so its time and space complexity are O(n) for a list of $n$ elements. It may thus be a source of inefficiency if used unnecessarily.

The nconc function (called append! in Scheme) concatenates its arguments destructively, altering the last cdr of each non-nil argument except the last, making it point to the next list.

(setq q '(1 2 3) r '(a b) s '() t '(6))
(nconc q r s t)
;Output: (1 2 3 a b 6)
(list q r s t)
;Output: ((1 2 3 a b 6) (a b 6) () (6))

==== Implementation ====
Append can be defined recursively in terms of cons. The two-argument case in Scheme:

(define append2
  (lambda (ls1 ls2)
    (if (null? ls1)
      ls2
      (cons (car ls1) (append2 (cdr ls1) ls2)))))

Append can also be implemented using Scheme fold-right or Common Lisp reduce:

(define append
   (lambda (a b)
      (fold-right cons b a)))

=== Prolog ===
The logic programming language Prolog features a built-in append predicate, which can be implemented as follows:

append([],Ys,Ys).
append([X|Xs],Ys,[X|Zs]) :-
    append(Xs,Ys,Zs).

This predicate can be used for appending, but also for picking lists apart. Calling

 ?- append(L,R,[1,2,3]).

yields the solutions:

L = [], R = [1, 2, 3] ;
L = [1], R = [2, 3] ;
L = [1, 2], R = [3] ;
L = [1, 2, 3], R = []

=== Miranda ===
In Miranda, this right-fold, from Hughes (1989:5-6), has the same semantics (by example) as the Scheme implementation above, for two arguments.

append a b = reduce cons b a

Where reduce is Miranda's name for fold, and cons constructs a list from two values or lists.

For example,

append [1,2] [3,4] = reduce cons [3,4] [1,2]
    = (reduce cons [3,4]) (cons 1 (cons 2 nil))
    = cons 1 (cons 2 [3,4]))
        (replacing cons by cons and nil by [3,4])
    = [1,2,3,4]

=== Haskell ===
In Haskell, this right-fold has the same effect as the Scheme implementation above:

append :: [a] -> [a] -> [a]
append xs ys = foldr (:) ys xs

This is essentially a reimplementation of Haskell's ++ operator.

=== Perl ===
In Perl, the push function is equivalent to the append method, and can be used in the following way.

my @list;
push @list, 1;
push @list, 2, 3;

The end result is a list containing [1, 2, 3]

The unshift function appends to the front of a list, rather than the end

my @list;
unshift @list, 1;
unshift @list, 2, 3;

The end result is a list containing [2, 3, 1]

When opening a file, use the ">>" mode to append rather than over write.

open(my $fh, '>>', "/some/file.txt");
print $fh "Some new text\n";
close $fh;

Note that when opening and closing file handles, one should always check the return value.

=== Python ===
In Python, the infix operator + concatenates its arguments:

>>> l = [1, 2]
>>> l + [3,4]
[1, 2, 3, 4]
>>> l
[1, 2]

The list method extend and the augmented assignment operator += append by modification:

>>> l = [1, 2]
>>> l.extend([3, 4])
>>> l
[1, 2, 3, 4]
>>> l += [5, 6]
>>> l
[1, 2, 3, 4, 5, 6]

The list method append appends a single element to a list by modification:

>>> l = [1, 2]
>>> l.append(3)
>>> l
[1, 2, 3]

=== Bash ===
In Bash the append redirect is the usage of ">>" for adding a stream to something, like in the following series of shell commands:

echo Hello world! >text; echo Goodbye world! >>text; cat text

The stream "Goodbye world!" is added to the text file written in the first command. The ";" implies the execution of the given commands in order, not simultaneously. So, the final content of the text file is:

Hello world!
Goodbye world!

=== Other languages ===
Other high-level programming languages which feature linked lists as primitive data structures have adopted an append. To append lists, as an operator, Haskell uses ++, OCaml uses @. Other languages use the + or ++ symbols to nondestructively concatenate a string, list, or array.

== Implementation ==
String concatenation generally occurs at run time. For string literals, it can be done at compile time as a special case of constant folding.

== Concatenation of sets of strings ==
In formal language theory and pattern matching (including regular expressions), the concatenation operation on strings is generalised to an operation on sets of strings as follows:

For two sets of strings S_{1} and S_{2}, the concatenation S_{1}S_{2} consists of all strings of the form vw where v is a string from S_{1} and w is a string from S_{2}, or formally S_{1}S_{2} = { vw : v ∈ S_{1}, w ∈ S_{2} }. Many authors also use concatenation of a string set and a single string, and vice versa, which are defined similarly by S_{1}w = { vw : v ∈ S_{1} } and vS_{2} = { vw : w ∈ S_{2} }. In these definitions, the string vw is the ordinary concatenation of strings v and w as defined in the introductory section.

For example, if F = { a, b, c, d, e, f, g, h }, and R = { 1, 2, 3, 4, 5, 6, 7, 8 }, then FR denotes the set of all chess board coordinates in algebraic notation, while eR denotes the set of all coordinates of the kings' file.

In this context, sets of strings are often referred to as formal languages. The concatenation operator is usually expressed as simple juxtaposition (as with multiplication).

== Algebraic properties ==
The strings over an alphabet, with the concatenation operation, form an associative algebraic structure called a free monoid. The identity element is the null string.

Sets of strings with concatenation and alternation form a semiring, with concatenation distributing over alternation. The identity for alternation (the 0 element) is the empty set and identity for concatenation (the 1 element) is the set containing just the null string.

== Applications ==
=== Audio and telephony ===
In programming for telephony, concatenation is used to provide dynamic audio feedback to a user. For example, in a "time of day" speaking clock, concatenation is used to give the correct time by playing the appropriate recordings concatenated together. For example: "at the tone, the time will be", "eight", "thirty", "five", "and", "twenty", "five", "seconds".

The recordings themselves exist separately, but playing them one after the other provides a grammatically correct sentence to the listener.

This technique is also used in number change announcements, voice mail systems, or most telephony applications that provide dynamic feedback to the caller (e.g. moviefone, tellme, and others).

Programming for any kind of computerised public address system can also employ concatenation for dynamic public announcements (for example, flights in an airport). The system would archive recorded speech of numbers, routes or airlines, destinations, times, etc. and play them back in a specific sequence to produce a grammatically correct sentence that is announced throughout the facility.

=== Database theory ===
One of the principles of relational database design is that the fields of data tables should reflect a single characteristic of the table's subject, which means that they should not contain concatenated strings. When concatenation is desired in a report, it should be provided at the time of running the report. For example, to display the physical address of a certain customer, the data might include building number, street name, building sub-unit number, city name, state/province name, postal code, and country name, e.g., "123 Fake St Apt 4, Boulder, CO 80302, USA", which combines seven fields. However, the customers data table should not use one field to store that concatenated string; rather, the concatenation of the seven fields should happen upon running the report. The reason for such principles is that without them, the entry and updating of large volumes of data becomes error-prone and labor-intensive. Separately entering the city, state, ZIP code, and nation allows data-entry validation (such as detecting an invalid state abbreviation). Then those separate items can be used for sorting or indexing the records, such as all with "Boulder" as the city name.

=== Recreational mathematics ===
In recreational mathematics, many problems concern the properties of numbers under concatenation of their numerals in some base. Examples include home primes (primes obtained by repeatedly factoring the increasing concatenation of prime factors of a given number), Smarandache–Wellin numbers (the concatenations of the first prime numbers), and the Champernowne and Copeland–Erdős constants (the real numbers formed by the decimal representations of the positive integers and the prime numbers, respectively).

== See also ==
- Rope (data structure)

== Bibliography ==
- Hughes, John (1989). "Why functional programming matters" (PDF). Computer Journal. 32 (2): 98–107. doi:10.1093/comjnl/32.2.98. Archived from the original (PDF) on 13 April 2007.
- Steele, Guy L. (1990). COMMON LISP: the language (2nd ed.). Bedford, Mass: Digital Press. p. 418. ISBN 1-55558-041-6.
