= 2520 (number) =

← 2519	2520	2521 →
- List of numbers; Integers; ← 0 1k 2k 3k 4k 5k 6k 7k 8k 9k →
- Cardinal: two thousand five hundred twenty
- Ordinal: 2520th (two thousand five hundred twentieth)
- Factorization: 2^{3} × 3^{2} × 5 × 7
- Greek numeral: ,ΒΦΚ´
- Roman numeral: MMDXX, mmdxx
- Binary: 100111011000_{2}
- Ternary: 10110100_{3}
- Senary: 15400_{6}
- Octal: 4730_{8}
- Duodecimal: 1560_{12}
- Hexadecimal: 9D8_{16}

2520 (two thousand five hundred [and] twenty) is the natural number following 2519 and preceding 2521.

== In mathematics ==
2520 is:

- the smallest number divisible by all integers from one to ten, i.e., it is their least common multiple.
- the last highly composite number that is half of the next highly composite number.
- the eighteenth highly composite number, and the last highly composite number that is a divisor of all following highly composite numbers.
- the seventh colossally abundant number.
- palindromic in undecimal (1991_{11}) and a repdigit in bases 55, 59, and 62.
- a Harshad number in all bases between binary and hexadecimal.
- the aliquot sum of 1080.
- the order of alternating group A_{6,} and the number of even permutations of 6 letters.

=== Factors ===
The factors, also called divisors, of 2520 are:

1, 2, 3, 4, 5, 6, 7, 8, 9, 10, 12, 14, 15, 18, 20, 21, 24, 28, 30, 35, 36, 40, 42, 45, 56, 60, 63, 70, 72, 84, 90, 105, 120, 126, 140, 168, 180, 210, 252, 280, 315, 360, 420, 504, 630, 840, 1260, 2520.
