= Arthur Herbert Copeland =

American mathematician (1898–1970)

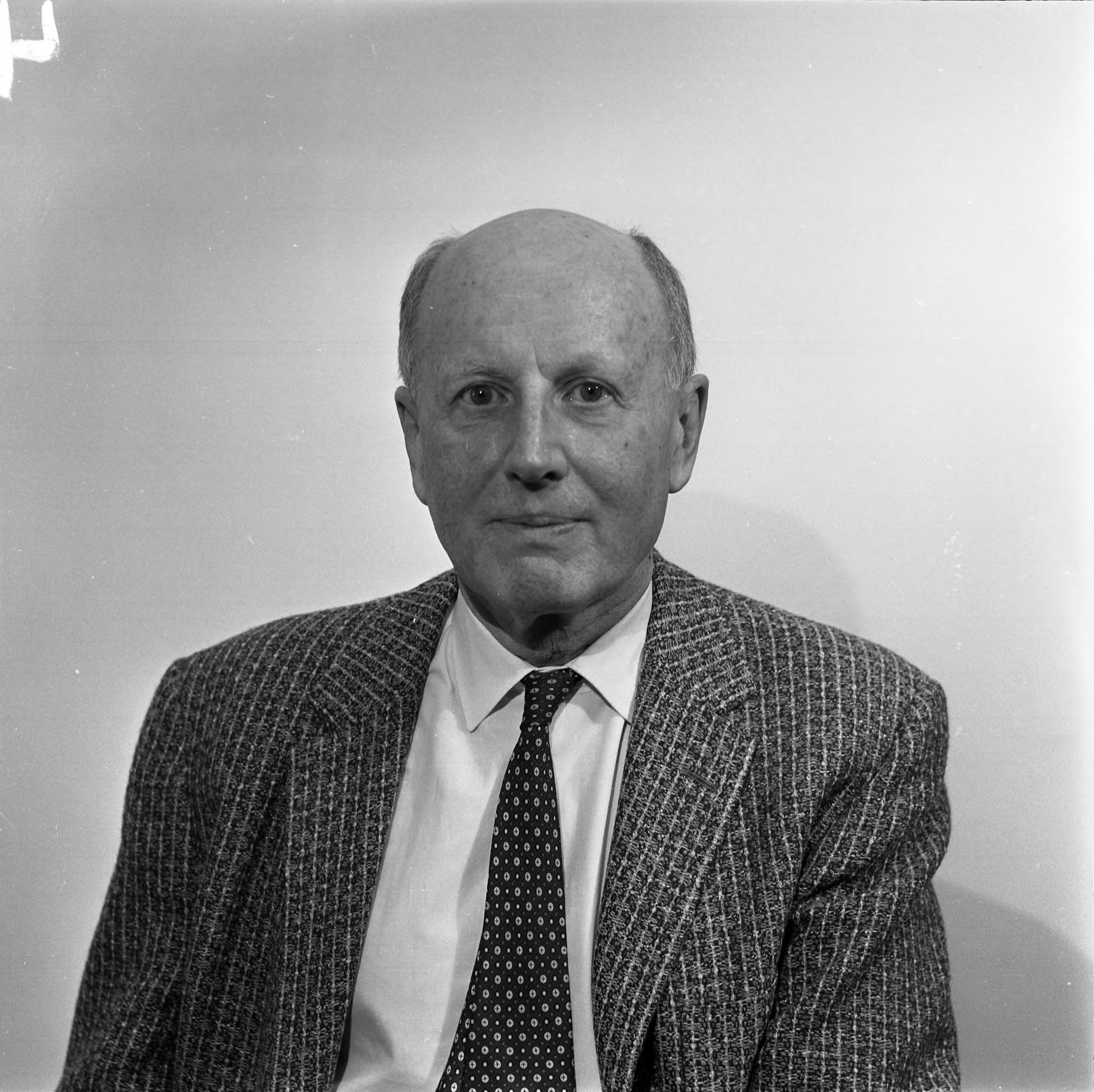
- Copeland in 1964
- Born: June 22, 1898
- Died: July 6, 1970 (aged 72)
- Known for: Copeland-Erdős constant Copeland's method
- Scientific career
- Fields: Mathematics
- Workplaces: Rice University; University of Michigan
- Doctoral advisor: O. D. Kellogg
- Doctoral students: Ronald Getoor; Howard Raiffa

Arthur Herbert Copeland (June 22, 1898 Rochester, New York – July 6, 1970) was an American mathematician. He graduated from Harvard University in 1926 and taught at Rice University and the University of Michigan. His main interest was in the foundations of probability.

He worked with Paul Erdős on the Copeland-Erdős constant. His son, Arthur Herbert Copeland, Jr. (1926-2019), was also a mathematician.

Copeland published a paper about pairwise voting, which was very similar to the work of Ramon Llull and Marquis de Condorcet. The system he described became known as "Copeland's method".

== Selected works ==
- Copeland, A. H. (1927). "Note on the Fourier development of continuous functions". Bull. Amer. Math. Soc. 33 (6): 689–692. doi:10.1090/s0002-9904-1927-04457-3. MR 1561449.
- Copeland, A. H. (1928). "Types of motion of the gyroscope". Trans. Amer. Math. Soc. 30 (4): 737–764. doi:10.1090/s0002-9947-1928-1501456-4. MR 1501456.
- Copeland, A. H. (1936). "A mixture theorem for nonconservative mechanical systems". Bull. Amer. Math. Soc. 42 (12): 895–900. doi:10.1090/s0002-9904-1936-06461-x. MR 1563461.
- Copeland, Arthur H. (1937). "Consistency of the conditions determining Kollektivs". Trans. Amer. Math. Soc. 42 (3): 333–357. doi:10.1090/s0002-9947-1937-1501925-2. MR 1501925.
- Copeland, A. H. (1937). "A new definition of a Stieltjes integral". Bull. Amer. Math. Soc. 43 (8): 581–588. doi:10.1090/s0002-9904-1937-06610-9. MR 1563591.
- "The Teaching of the Calculus of Probability". Notre Dame Mathematical Lectures, Number 4. Notre Dame, Indiana: University of Notre Dame Press. 1944. pp. 31–43.
- with Paul Erdős: Copeland, Arthur H.; Erdös, Paul (1946). "Note on normal numbers". Bull. Amer. Math. Soc. 52 (10): 857–860. doi:10.1090/s0002-9904-1946-08657-7. MR 0017743.
- with Frank Harary: Copeland, Arthur H.; Harary, Frank (1953). "The extension of an arbitrary Boolean algebra to an implicative Boolean algebra". Proc. Amer. Math. Soc. 4 (5): 751–758. doi:10.1090/s0002-9939-1953-0057229-5. MR 0057229.
- Geometry, Algebra, and Trigonometry by Vector Methods. NY: Macmillan. 1962, 298 pp.
