= Disjunct =

The term disjunct can refer to:

- disjunct (linguistics)
- disjunct or quincunx in astrology, an aspect made when two planets are 150 degrees, or five signs apart
- a disjunct distribution in biology, one in which two closely related taxa are widely separated geographically
- disjunct (music), a melodic skip or leap
- operand of a logical disjunction
