= Disjoint =

Disjoint may refer to:

- Disjoint sets, sets with no common elements
- Mutual exclusivity, the impossibility of a pair of propositions both being true

== See also ==
- Disjoint union
- Disjoint-set data structure
