= Copeland–Erdős constant =

Irrational number based on primes

In mathematics, the Copeland–Erdős constant is the concatenation of "0." with the base 10 representations of the prime numbers in order. Its value, using the modern definition of prime, (Note: Copeland and Erdős considered 1 a prime, and they defined the constant as 0.12357111317...) is

$$\sum_{n=1}^\infty p_n 10^{-\left(n + \sum_{k=1}^n \lfloor \log_{10}{p_k} \rfloor \right)} \approx 0.2\;3\;5\;7\;11\;13\;17\;19\;23\;29\;31\;37...$$

(sequence A033308 in the OEIS). In base 10, the constant is a normal number, a fact proven by Arthur Herbert Copeland and Paul Erdős. It follows that the constant is irrational; this can also be proven with Dirichlet's theorem on arithmetic progressions or Bertrand's postulate or Ramaré's theorem that every even integer is a sum of at most six primes.

By a similar argument, any constant created by concatenating "0." with all primes in an arithmetic progression $dn+a$, where $a$ is coprime to $d$ and to 10, will be irrational. By Dirichlet's theorem, the arithmetic progression $dn\cdot 10^m+a$ contains primes for all $m$, and those primes are also in $cd+a$, so the concatenated primes contain arbitrarily long sequences of the digit zero.

Its simple continued fraction is $[0;4,4,8,16,5,1,\dots]$ (sequence A030168 in the OEIS).

== Related constants ==
Copeland and Erdős's proof that their constant is normal relies only on the fact that the sequence $(p_n)_{n\in\N}$ of primes is strictly increasing and $p_n = n^{1+o(1)}$. More generally, if $s_n$ is any strictly increasing sequence of natural numbers such that $s_n = n^{1+o(1)}$ and $b$ is any natural number greater than or equal to 2, then the constant obtained by concatenating "0." with the base-$b$ representations of the terms $s_n$ is normal in base $b$. For example, the sequence $\lfloor n (\log n)^2\rfloor$ satisfies these conditions, so the constant

$$0.003712192634435363748597110122136...$$

is normal in base 10, and $0.003101525354661104..._7$ is normal in base 7.

Moreover, in any given base $b$ the number $\textstyle \sum_{n=1}^\infty b^{-p_n}$, which can be written in base $b$ as

$$0.0110101000101000101..._b$$

where the $n$th digit is 1 if and only if $n$ is prime, is irrational.

== See also ==
- Smarandache–Wellin numbers: the truncated value of this constant multiplied by the appropriate power of 10
- Champernowne constant: concatenating all natural numbers, not just primes
