= Magic cube (disambiguation) =

A magic cube is a collection of integers arranged in an $n$ × $n$ × $n$ pattern.

The phrase magic cube or Magic Cube may also refer to:

- Rubik's Cube
- Tianjin Joyful Sea Magic Cube

== Mathematics ==
- Magic cube classes
- Diagonal magic cube
- Pandiagonal magic cube
- Pantriagonal magic cube
- Perfect magic cube
- Semiperfect magic cube
- Simple magic cube

== See also ==
- Magic hypercube
- Magic square
