= Perfect magic cube =

Magic cube with extra constraints

In mathematics, a perfect magic cube is a magic cube in which not only the columns, rows, pillars, and main space diagonals, but also the cross section diagonals sum up to the cube's magic constant.

Perfect magic cubes of order one are trivial; cubes of orders two to four can be proven not to exist, and cubes of orders five and six were first discovered by Walter Trump and Christian Boyer on November 13 and September 1, 2003, respectively. A perfect magic cube of order seven was given by A. H. Frost in 1866, and on March 11, 1875, an article was published in the Cincinnati Commercial newspaper on the discovery of a perfect magic cube of order 8 by Gustavus Frankenstein. Perfect magic cubes of orders nine and eleven have also been constructed. The first perfect cube of order 10 was constructed in 1988 (Li Wen, China).

== An alternative definition ==
In recent years, an alternative definition for the perfect magic cube was proposed by John R. Hendricks. By this definition, a perfect magic cube is one in which all possible lines through each cell sum to the magic constant. The name Nasik magic hypercube is another, unambiguous, name for such a cube. This definition is based on the fact that a pandiagonal magic square has traditionally been called 'perfect', because all possible lines sum correctly.

Gabriel Arnoux constructed an order 17 perfect magic cube in 1887. F.A.P.Barnard published order 8 and order 11 perfect cubes in 1888.

By the modern (given by J.R. Hendricks) definition, there are actually six classes of magic cube; simple magic cubes, pantriagonal magic cubes, diagonal magic cubes, pantriagonal diagonal magic cubes, pandiagonal magic cubes, and perfect magic cubes.

== Examples ==
1. Order 4 cube by Thomas Krijgsman, 1982; magic constant 130.

Level 1
32	5	52	41
3	42	31	54
61	24	33	12
34	59	14	23

Level 2
10	35	22	63
37	64	9	20
27	2	55	46
56	29	44	1

Level 3
49	28	45	8
30	7	50	43
36	57	16	21
15	38	19	58

Level 4
39	62	11	18
60	17	40	13
6	47	26	51
25	4	53	48

2. Order 5 cube by Walter Trump and Christian Boyer, 2003-11-13; magic constant 315.

Level 1
25	16	80	104	90
115	98	4	1	97
42	111	85	2	75
66	72	27	102	48
67	18	119	106	5

Level 2
91	77	71	6	70
52	64	117	69	13
30	118	21	123	23
26	39	92	44	114
116	17	14	73	95

Level 3
47	61	45	76	86
107	43	38	33	94
89	68	63	58	37
32	93	88	83	19
40	50	81	65	79

Level 4
31	53	112	109	10
12	82	34	87	100
103	3	105	8	96
113	57	9	62	74
56	120	55	49	35

Level 5
121	108	7	20	59
29	28	122	125	11
51	15	41	124	84
78	54	99	24	60
36	110	46	22	101

== See also ==
- John R. Hendricks
- Magic cube classes
- Nasik magic hypercube
