= Avocation =

Calling, which may or may not provide employment

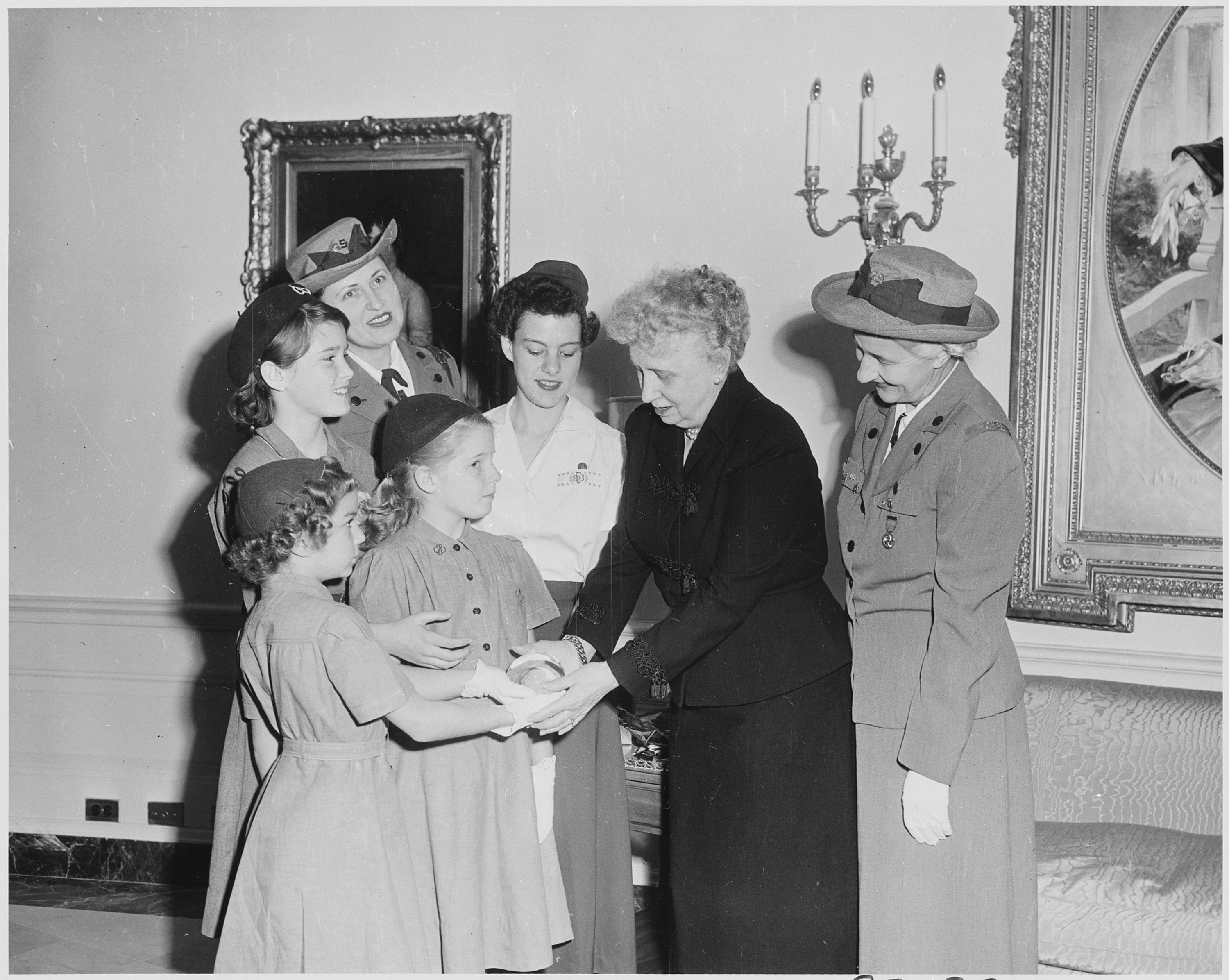
American First Lady Bess Truman with Girl Scouts and their volunteer leaders

An avocation is an activity that someone engages in as a hobby outside their main occupation. There are many examples of people whose professions were the ways that they made their livings, but for whom their activities outside their workplaces were their true passions in life. Occasionally, as with Lord Baden-Powell and others, people who pursue an avocation are more remembered by history for their avocation than for their professional career.

Many times, a person's regular vocation may lead to an avocation. Many forms of humanitarian campaigning, such as work for organizations like Amnesty International and Greenpeace, may be done by people involved in the law or human rights issues as part of their work.

Many people involved with youth work pursue this as an avocation.

== See also ==
- Alter ego
- Otium
- Secret identity
- Vocation
- Volunteering
- List of amateur mathematicians
