= Parshvanatha temple, Khajuraho =

Temple in Khajuraho, India

Parshvanatha temple
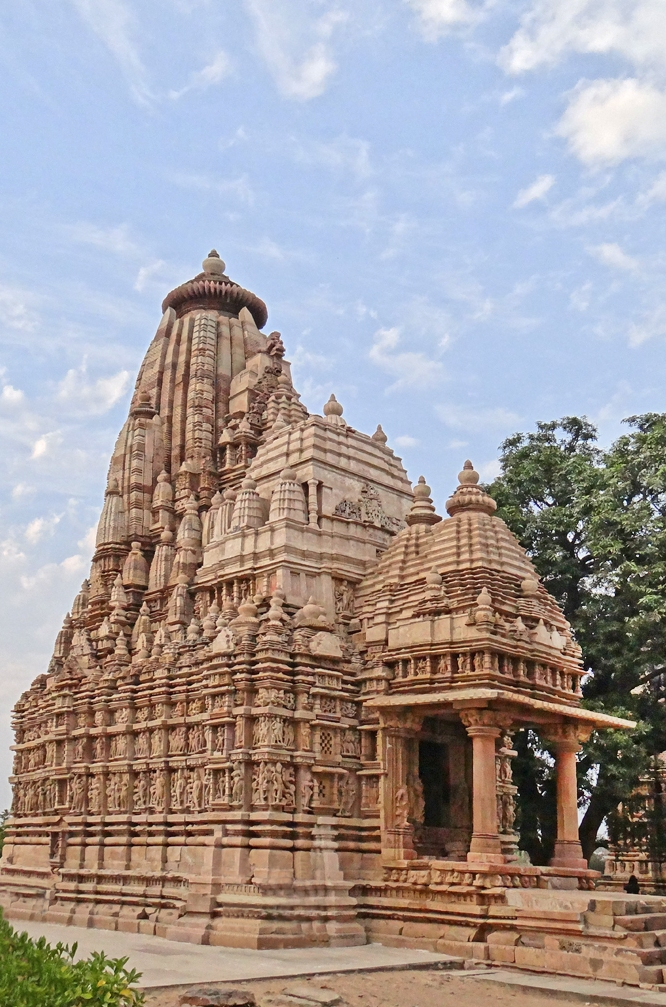
- Parshvanatha Jinalaya a.k.a. Jinanatha Temple

- Location in Madhya Pradesh, India Parshvanatha temple, Khajuraho (India)

Religion
- Affiliation: Jainism
- District: Chhatarpur
- Deity: Parshvanatha

Location
- Location: Khajuraho
- State: Madhya Pradesh
- Country: India
- Interactive map of Parshvanatha temple
- Coordinates: 24.8448503°N 79.9365747°E

Architecture
- Creator: Dhanga
- Established: 950–970 CE
- UNESCO World Heritage Site
- Official name: Khajuraho Group of Monuments
- Criteria: Cultural: (i)(iii)
- Designated: 1986 (session)
- Reference no.: 240

Parshvanatha temple (IAST: Pārśvanātha Mandir) is a 10th-century Digambara Jain temple at Khajuraho in Madhya Pradesh, India. It is now dedicated to Parshvanatha, although it was probably built as an Adinatha shrine during the Chandela period. Despite the temple's Jain affiliation, its exterior walls feature Vaishnavaite themes. The entrance has an inscription with a most-perfect magic square. It is part of a UNESCO World Heritage Site along with other temples in the Khajuraho Group of Monuments, because of its outstanding art, architecture, and testimony of the Chandela period.

== History ==
The temple is believed to have been constructed by a prominent Jain family between 950 and 970 CE, during the reign of the Chandela king Dhanga. A 954 CE (1011 VS) inscription on the left door jamb of the temple records gifts and endowments of gardens by one Pahila. The gardens are named Pahila-vatika, Chandra-vatika, Laghuchandra-vatika, Shankara-vatika, Panchaitala-vatika, Amra-vatika and Dhanga-vadi. The inscription describes Pahila as a devotee of Jinanatha and states that he was held in great esteem by the king Dhanga.

The earliest idol enshrined in the temple appears to have been that of Adinatha. When the British archaeological surveyor Alexander Cunningham visited in 1852, he found the main sanctum deserted. He described it as "Jinanatha temple" and wrote that it had been repaired by a Jain banker in 1847. In 1860, a Parshvanatha idol was installed in the main sanctum. An Adinatha statue was placed in a secondary shrine attached to the rear of the temple.

The temple has been classified as a Monument of National Importance by the Archaeological Survey of India.

== Art and architecture ==
The Parshvanatha temple is the largest among the Jain temples of Khajuraho. It has an entrance porch, a small hall, a large hall (mandapa), a vestibule, and a sanctum. The temple structure has an oblong architectural plan with projections at two ends. The front (eastern) projection forms the entrance porch, the back (western) projection is a shrine attached to the sanctum.

The ceiling of the entrance porch features chain and floral patterns, and a pair of intertwined flying vidyadharas. The door-lintel of the mandapa has the sculpture of Adinatha's attendant: a ten-armed Chakreshvari riding a Garuda. The sanctum features sculptures of the Jinas.

Interior of the temple with Jain deities

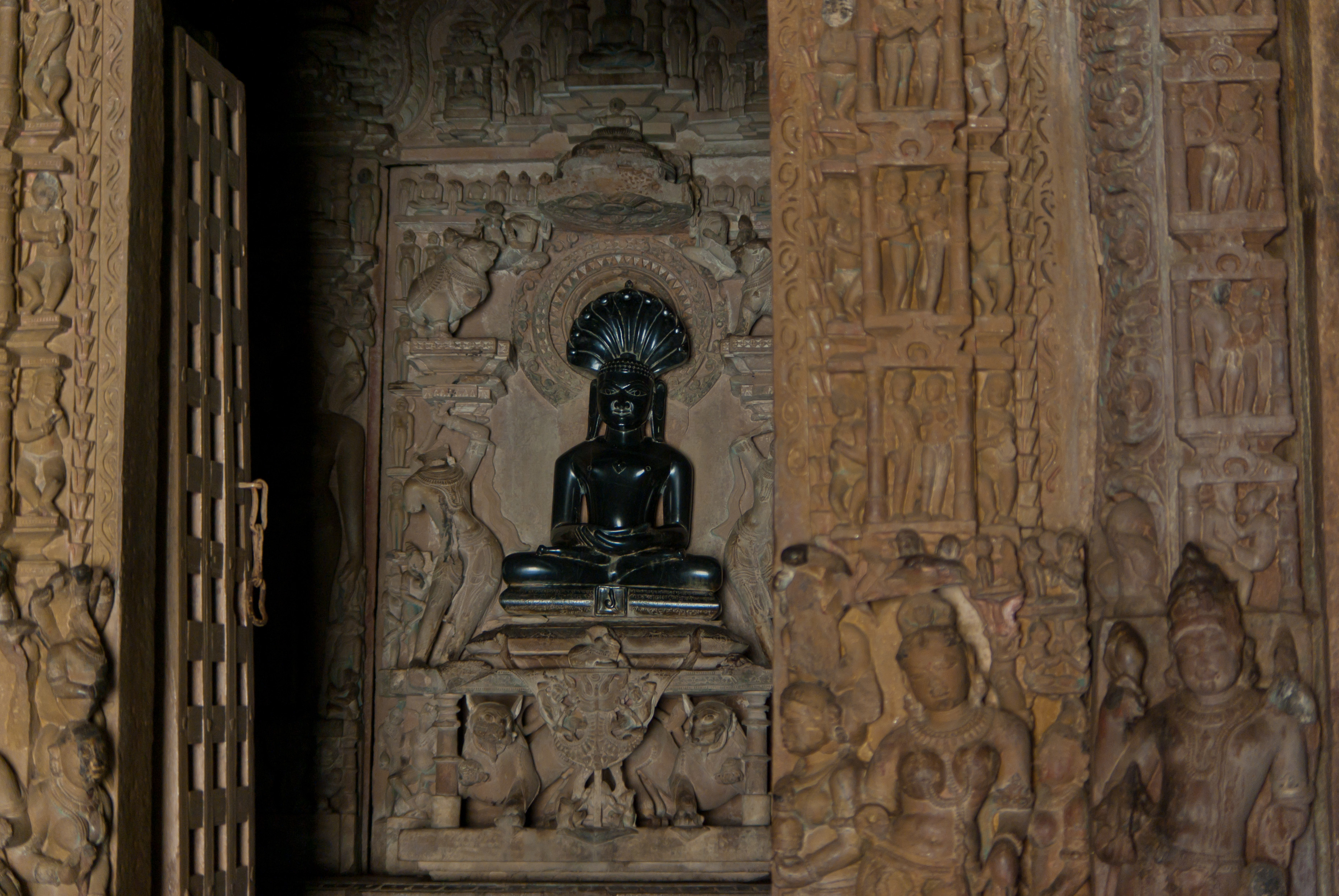

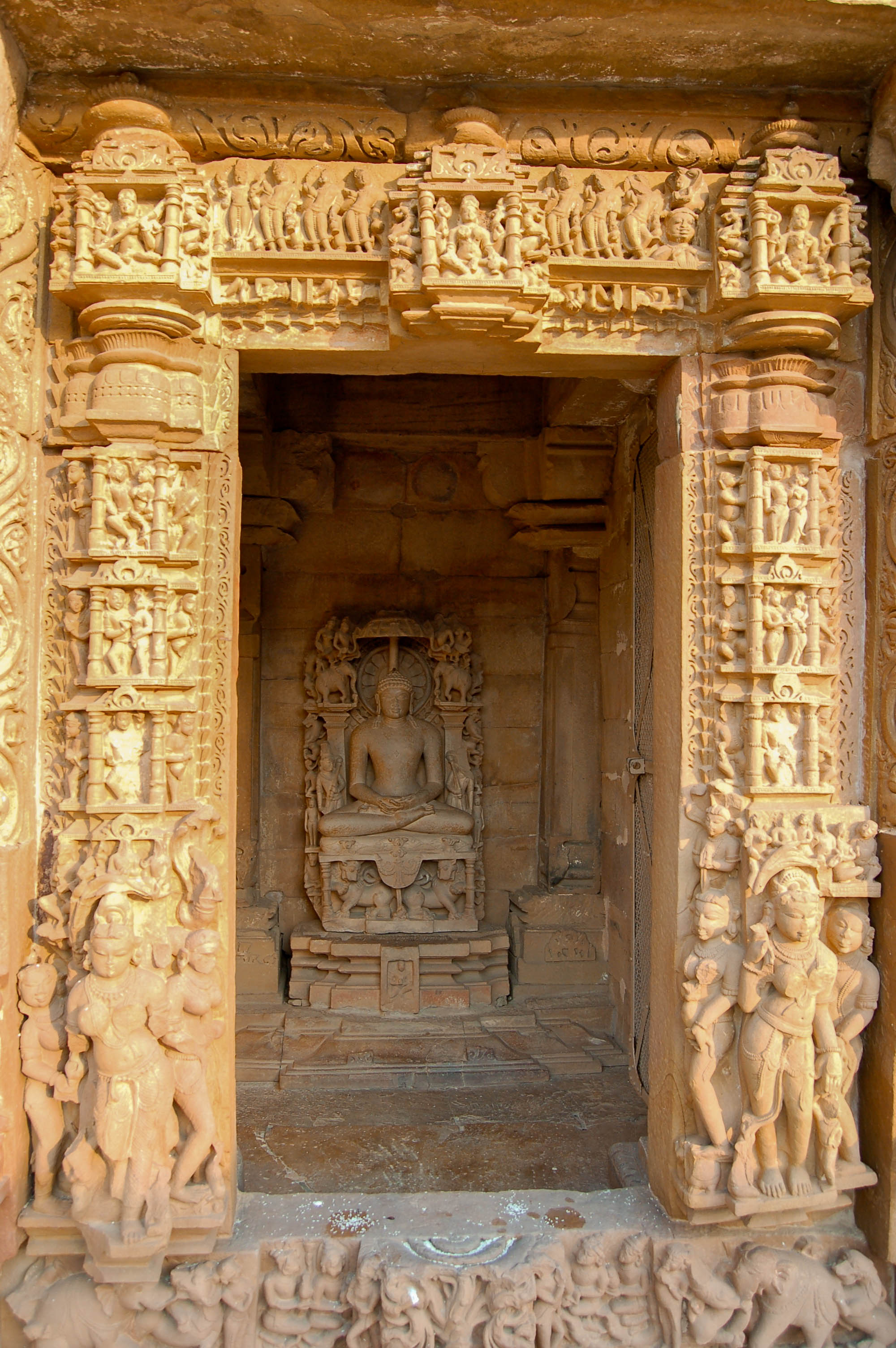

The outer walls have three bands of sculptures. These sculptures feature surasundaris (graceful women), flying couples, dancers, musicians, and celestial beings. Despite the temple's Jain affiliation, the outer walls also depict Vaishnavite themes including sculptures of Hindu gods and their incarnations with their consorts. These include Vishnu-Lakshmi, Rama-Sita, Balarama-Revati, Parashurama, Hanuman, Brahma and Yamalarjuna legend of Krishna. These sculptures are similar to those of the Lakshmana Temple in modeling, proportions and poise. Unlike the Lakshmana temple, the Parshvanatha temple doesn't feature explicit erotic sculptures, although one particular image appears to show a cross-legged apsara masturbating with an object.

Three bands of sculpture on the exterior wall

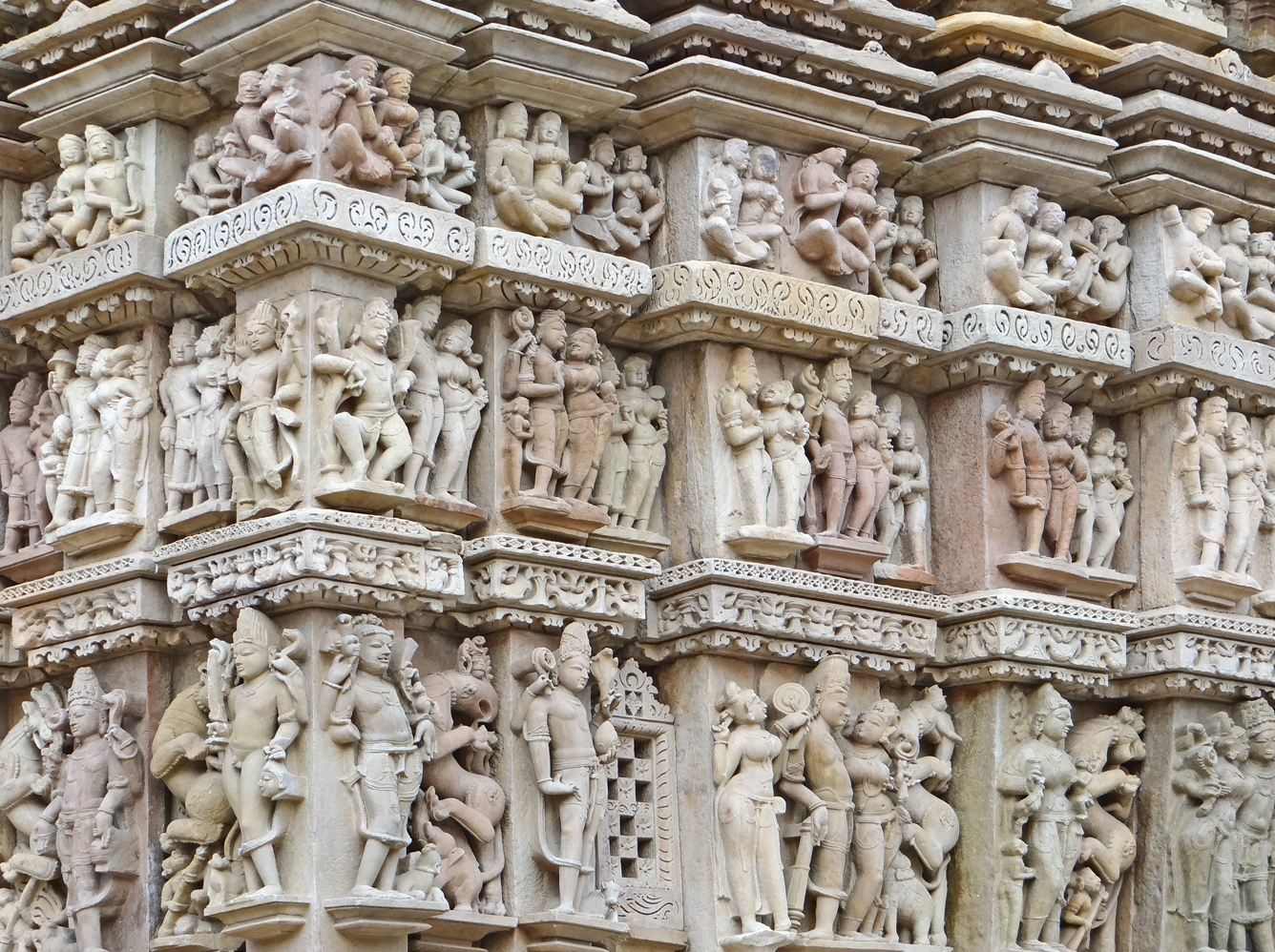

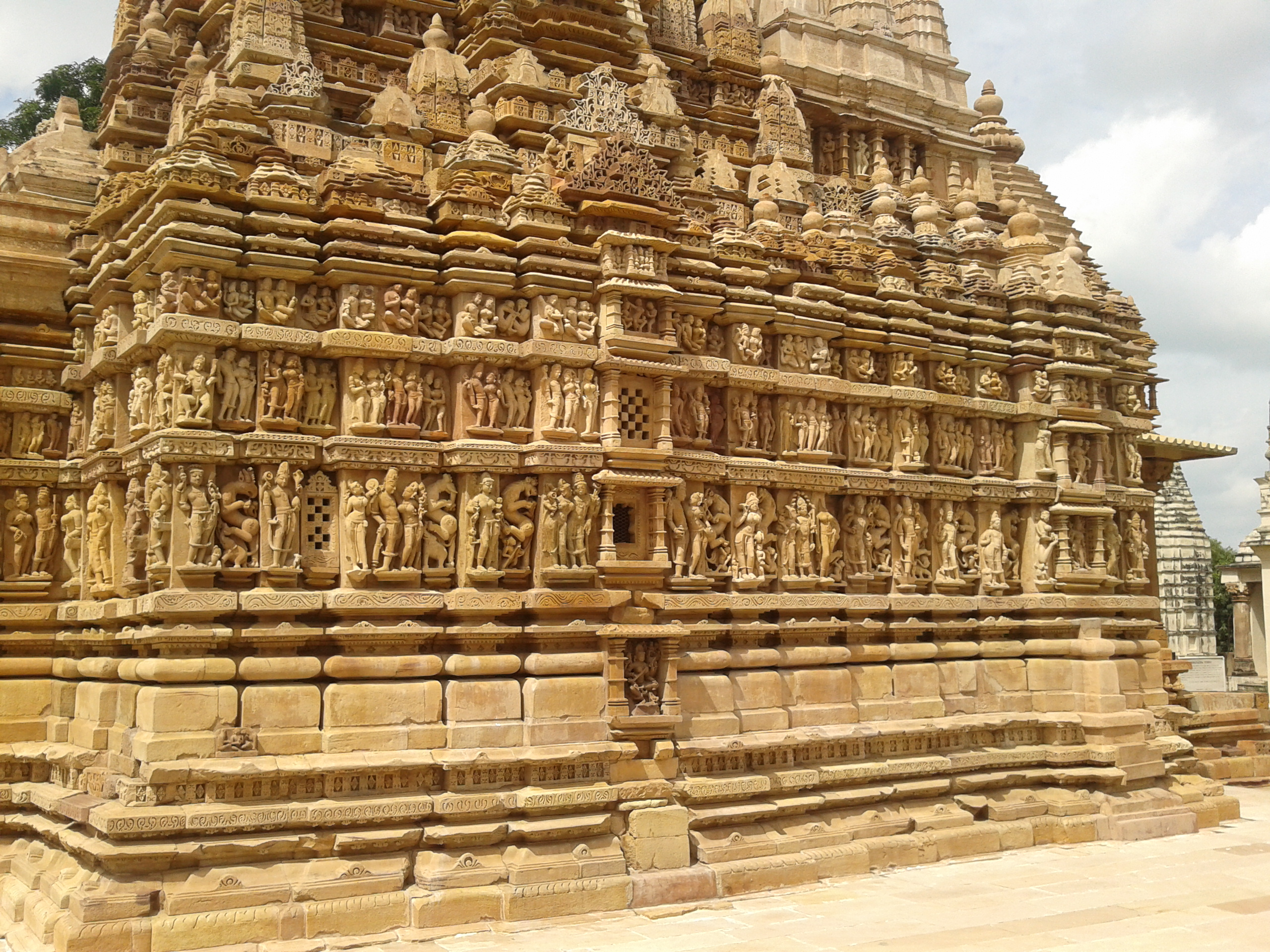

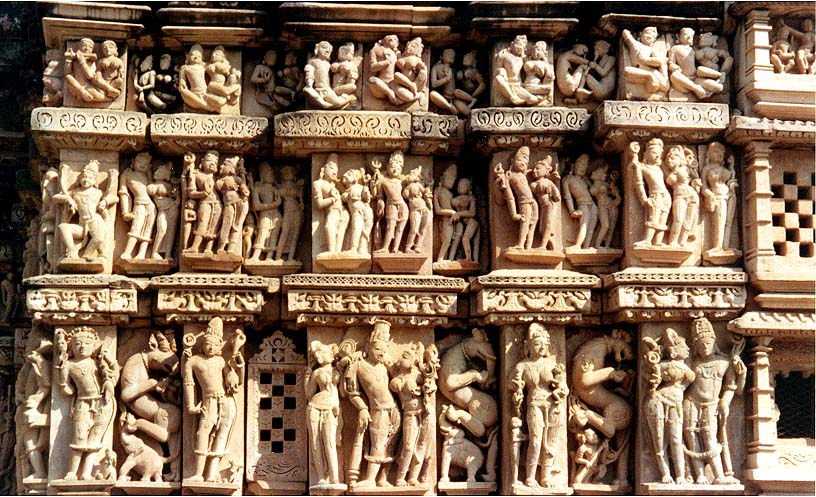
Close-up of the exterior sculptures

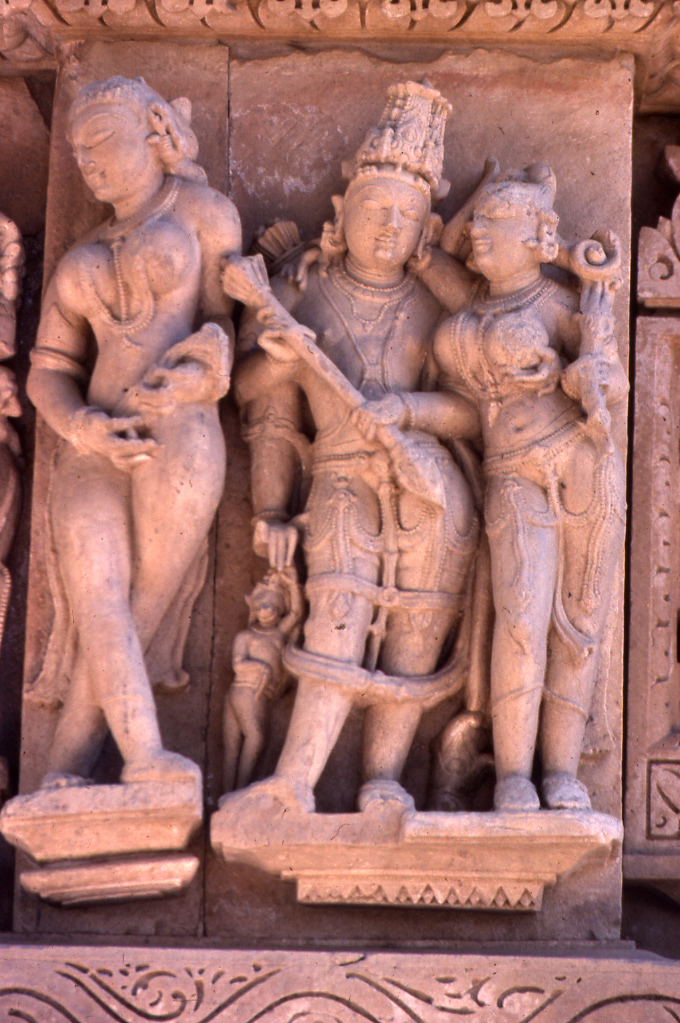
Cross-legged apsara and Vishnu-Lakshmi

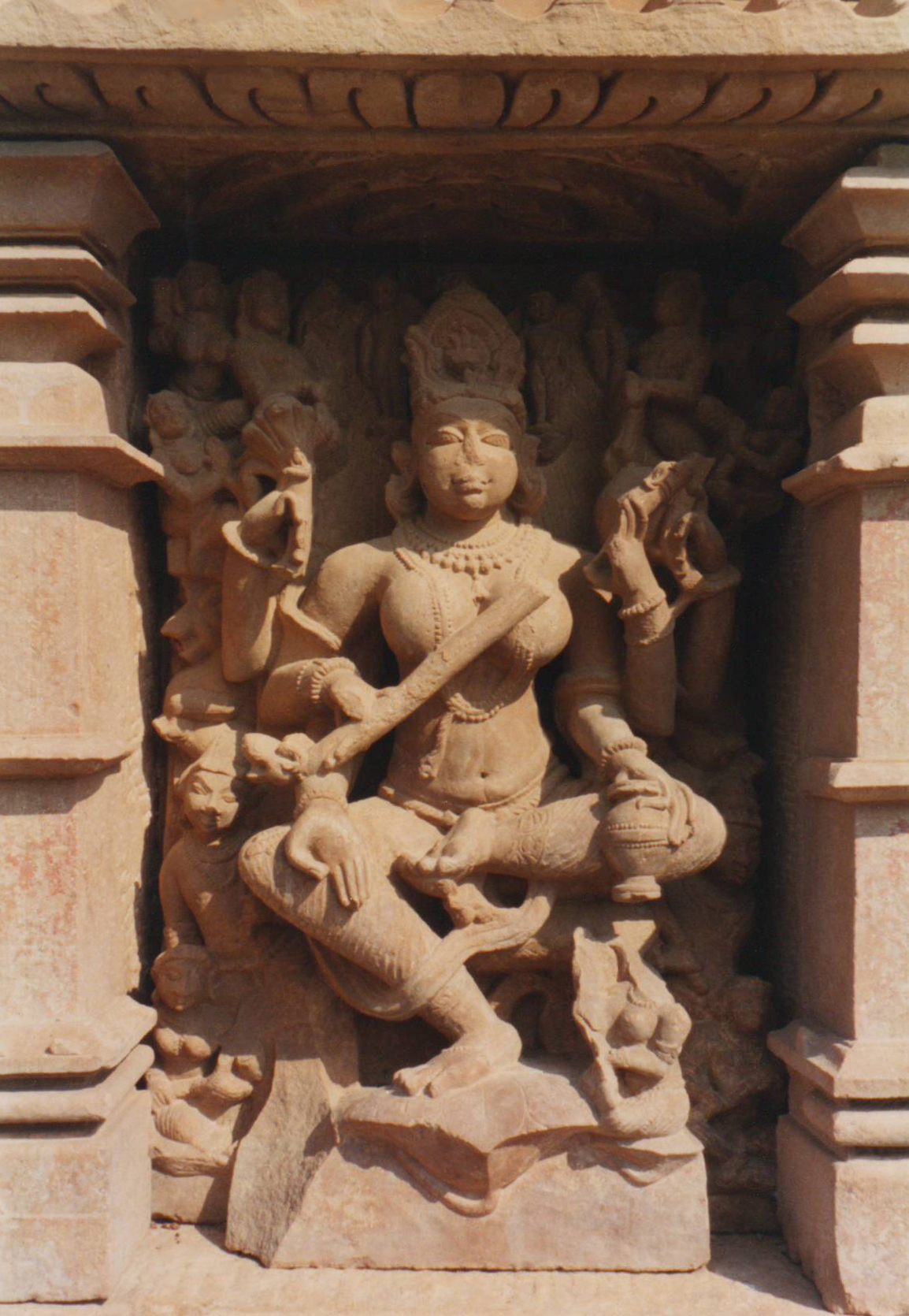
Goddess

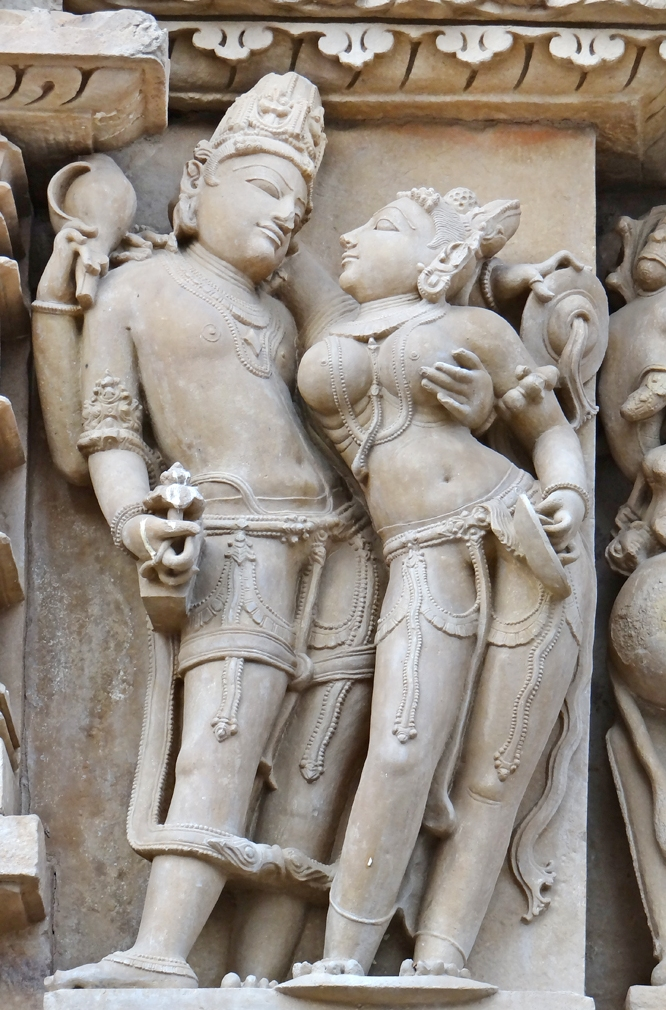
Couple

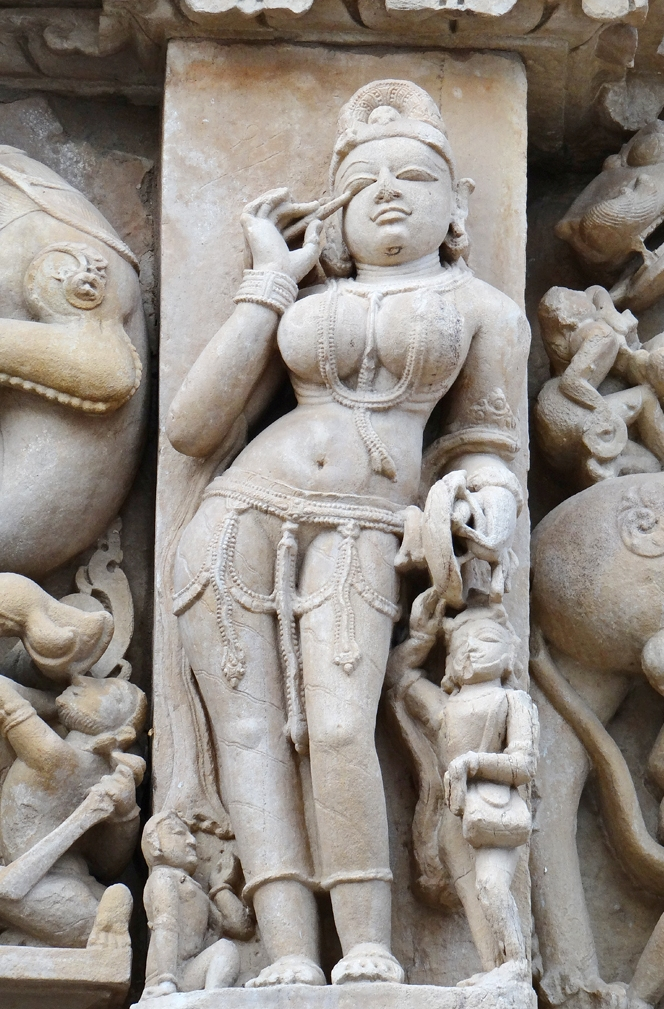
Surasundari applying eye makeup

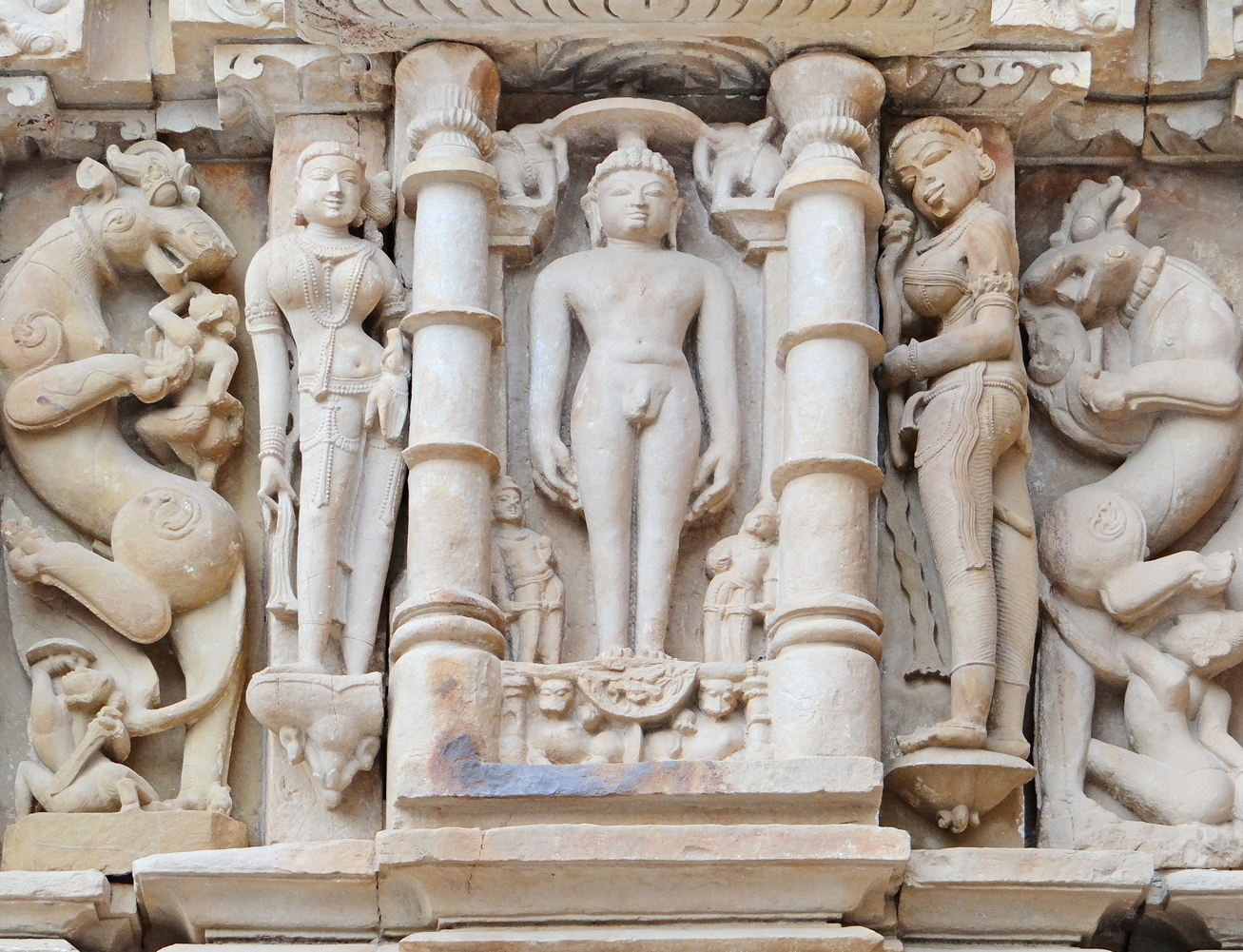
Tirthankara flanked by surasundaris and vyalas

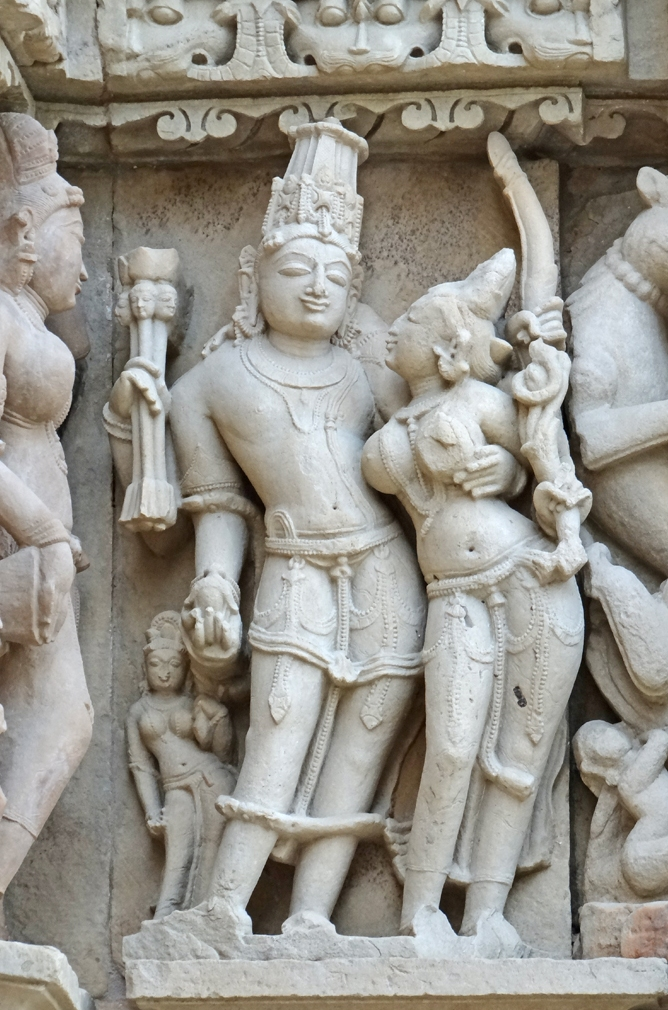
Kama and Rati

== Magic square ==
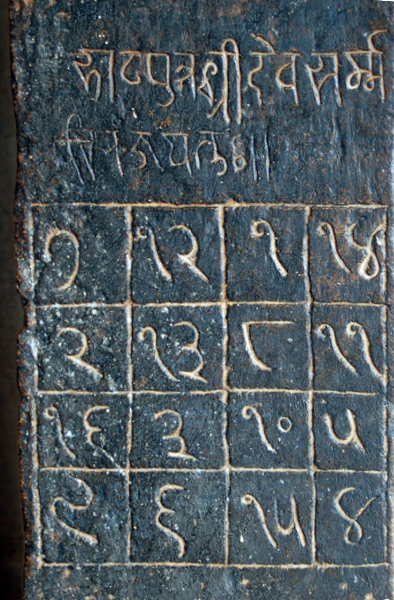
The inscription containing the 4×4 most-perfect magic square

The temple has an inscription with a magic square, called the "Jaina square". This is one of the oldest known 4×4 magic squares, as well as one of the oldest known most-perfect magic squares.

This magic square contains all the numbers from 1 to 16. The sum of the numbers in every horizontal row, every vertical column and the two diagonal rows is 34.

7	12	1	14
2	13	8	11
16	3	10	5
9	6	15	4

7	12	1	14
2	13	8	11
16	3	10	5
9	6	15	4

7	12	1	14
2	13	8	11
16	3	10	5
9	6	15	4

7	12	1	14
2	13	8	11
16	3	10	5
9	6	15	4

The sum of the numbers in the smaller 2×2 squares at the four corners, as well as those in the central 2×2 square, is also 34.

7	12	1	14
2	13	8	11
16	3	10	5
9	6	15	4

7	12	1	14
2	13	8	11
16	3	10	5
9	6	15	4

7	12	1	14
2	13	8	11
16	3	10	5
9	6	15	4

The magic square is pandiagonal, aka diabolic: the numbers in its broken diagonals also sum up to 34. For example, 7 + (6 + 10 + 11) = 34.

7	12	1	14
2	13	8	11
16	3	10	5
9	6	15	4

7	12	1	14
2	13	8	11
16	3	10	5
9	6	15	4

7	12	1	14
2	13	8	11
16	3	10	5
9	6	15	4

7	12	1	14
2	13	8	11
16	3	10	5
9	6	15	4
