= Face diagonal =

Concept in geometry

AC (shown in red) is a face diagonal while AC' (shown in blue) is a space diagonal.

In geometry, a face diagonal of a polyhedron is a diagonal on one of the faces, in contrast to a space diagonal passing through the interior of the polyhedron.

A cuboid has twelve face diagonals (two on each of the six faces), and it has four space diagonals. The cuboid's face diagonals can have up to three different lengths, since the faces come in congruent pairs and the two diagonals on any face are equal. The cuboid's space diagonals all have the same length. If the edge lengths of a cuboid are a, b, and c, then the distinct rectangular faces have edges (a, b), (a, c), and (b, c); so the respective face diagonals have lengths $\sqrt{a^2+b^2},$ $\sqrt{a^2+c^2},$ and $\sqrt{b^2+c^2}.$

Thus each face diagonal of a cube with side length a is $a\sqrt 2$. Additionally, the space diagonal of the same cube has length $a\sqrt 3$.
