= Frénicle standard form =

A magic square is in the Frénicle standard form, named for Bernard Frénicle de Bessy, if the following two conditions hold:

1. the element at position [1,1] (top left corner) is the smallest of the four corner elements; and
2. the element at position [1,2] (top edge, second from left) is smaller than the element in [2,1].

In 1693, Frénicle described all the 880 essentially different order-4 magic squares.

== Properties ==
This standard form was devised since a magic square remains "essentially similar" if it is rotated or transposed, or flipped so that the order of rows is reversed. There exist 8 different magic squares sharing one standard form. For example, the following magic squares are all essentially similar, with only the final square being in the Frénicle standard form:

 8 1 6   8 3 4     4 9 2   4 3 8     6 7 2   6 1 8     2 9 4   2 7 6
 3 5 7   1 5 9     3 5 7   9 5 1     1 5 9   7 5 3     7 5 3   9 5 1
 4 9 2   6 7 2     8 1 6   2 7 6     8 3 4   2 9 4     6 1 8   4 3 8

== Generalizations ==
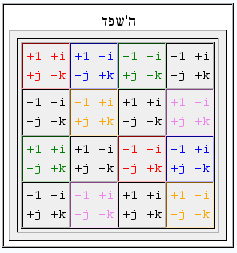
384

For each collection of magic squares one might identify the corresponding group of automorphisms, the group of transformations preserving the special properties of this collection of magic squares. This way one can identify the number of different magic square equivalence classes.

From the perspective of Galois theory, the most-perfect magic squares (enumerated in OEIS: A051235) are not distinguishable since the size of the associated Galois group is 1.
