= Sriramachakra =

Device used in astrology in Tamil Nadu

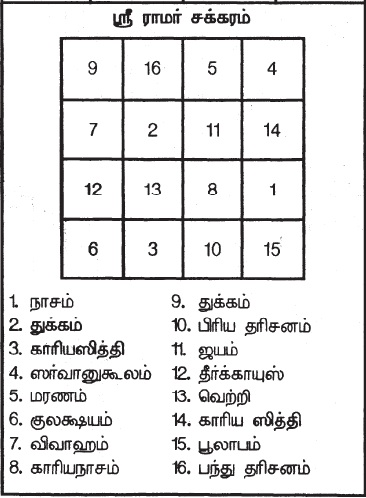
Image of Sri Rama Chakra as a magic square given in the Panchangam published by Sringeri Sharada Peetham.

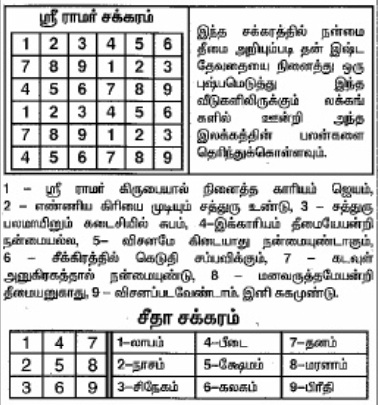
Images of Sri Rama Chakra and Seetha Chakra as given in Pambu Panchangam.

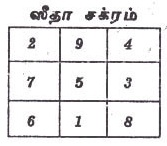
Image of Seetha Chakra as a magic square given in the Panchangam published by Srirangam Temple.

Sriramachakra (also called Sri Rama Chakra, Ramachakra, Rama Chakra, or Ramar Chakra) is a mystic diagram or a yantra given in Tamil almanacs as an instrument of astrology for predicting one's future. The geometrical diagram consists of a square divided into smaller squares by equal numbers of lines parallel to the sides of the square. Certain integers in well defined patterns are written in the various smaller squares. In some almanacs, for example, in the Panchangam published by the Sringeri Sharada Peetham or the Panchangam published by Srirangam Temple, the diagram takes the form of a magic square of order 4 with certain special properties. This magic square belongs to a certain class of magic squares called strongly magic squares (or complete magic squares) which has been so named and studied by T V Padmakumar, an amateur mathematician from Thiruvananthapuram, Kerala. In some almanacs, for example, in the Pambu Panchangam, the diagram consists of an arrangement of 36 small squares in 6 rows and 6 columns in which the digits 1, 2, ..., 9 are written in that order from left to right starting from the top-left corner, repeating the digits in the same direction once the digit 9 is reached.

There is another smaller mystic diagram, called Seetha Chakra given in Tamil almanacs. In some almanacs it is given as a magic square of order 3 whereas in some others it is an arrangement of 9 small squares in 3 rows and 3 columns in which the digits 1, 2, .. 9 are written in that order column-wise from left to right.

These Chakras are used by the believers to predict the future. A believer takes a small flower, prays to God seeking divine directions and drops the flower randomly on a board containing an inscription of one of the Chakras. The number on which the flower falls is believed to give a broad indication of the future of the believer. For example, if the design is Sri Rama Chakra in the form of a magic square and the number on which the flower has fallen is 11 then the person can expect "victory in his/her future endeavors".

== The Chakras ==
=== Sri Rama Chakras ===
Sringeri/Srirangam Panchangams

The Sri Rama Chakra as given in the Panchangam published by the Sringeri Sharada Peetham or the one published by Srirangam Temple is shown below.

9	16	5	4
7	2	11	14
12	13	8	1
6	3	10	15

This is a magic square of order 4. The sum of the numbers in every row, every column and each diagonal are all equal to 34.

Pambu Panchangam

The Sri Rama Chakra as given in Pambu Panchangam is shown below.

1	2	3	4	5	6
7	8	9	1	2	3
4	5	6	7	8	9
1	2	3	4	5	6
7	8	9	1	2	3
4	5	6	7	8	9

=== Seetha Chakras ===
Sringeri/Srirangam Panchangams

The Seetha Chakra as given in the Panchangam published by the Sringeri Sharada Peetham or the one published by Srirangam Temple is shown below.

2	9	4
7	5	3
6	1	8

This is a magic square of order 3. The sum of the numbers in every row, every column and each diagonal are all equal to 15.

Pambu Panchangam

The Seetha Chakra as given in Pambu Panchangam is shown below.

1	4	7
2	5	8
3	6	9

== Sri Rama Chakra as a strongly magic square ==
Let M be a magic square of order 4 and let it be represented by matrix as follows:

$$M=\begin{bmatrix}
a_{11} & a_{12} & a_{13} & a_{14} \\
a_{21} & a_{22} &a_{23} & a_{24} \\
a_{31} & a_{32} &a_{33} & a_{34} \\
a_{41} & a_{42} &a_{43} & a_{44} \\
\end{bmatrix}$$

The numbers in each row, and in each column, and the numbers that run diagonally in both directions, all add up to the number 34. M is called a strongly magic square if the following condition is satisfied:

For all m, n such that 1 ≤ m ≤ 4, 1 ≤ n ≤ 4, we have
$$a_{m,n}+a_{m,n+1}+a_{m+1,n}+a_{m+1,n+1}=34$$,
where it is assumed that if a subscript exceeds 4 it is replaced by 1 (wrapping around rows and columns).

For example in a strongly magic square M the following must be true.

$a_{23}+a_{24}+a_{33}+a_{34} = 34$ (taking m = 2, n = 3)
$a_{24}+a_{21}+a_{34}+a_{31} = 34$ (taking m = 2, n = 4)
$a_{44}+a_{41}+a_{14}+a_{11} = 34$ (taking m = 4, n = 4)

One can easily verify that the magic square represented by the Sri Rama Chakra is a strongly magic square.

== See also ==
- Pandiagonal magic square
- Luo Shu
