= Most-perfect magic square =

Data

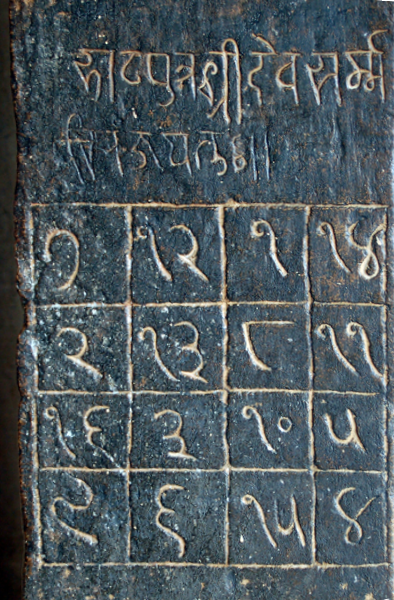
Most-perfect magic square from the Parshvanath Jain temple in Khajuraho, India

7	12	1	14
2	13	8	11
16	3	10	5
9	6	15	4

transcription of
the indian numerals

A most-perfect magic square of order n is a magic square containing the numbers 1 to n^{2} with two additional properties:

1. Each 2 × 2 subsquare sums to 2s, where s = n^{2} + 1.
2. All pairs of integers distant n/2 along a (major) diagonal sum to s.

There are 384 such combinations.

== Examples ==
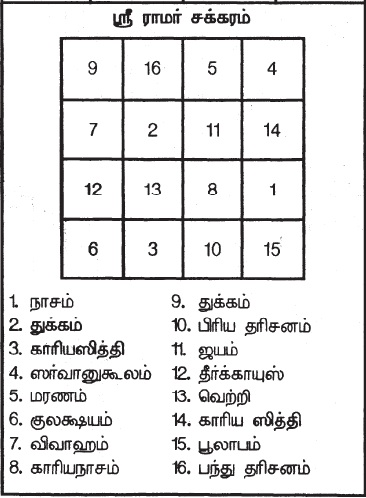
Image of Sriramachakra as a most-perfect magic square given in the Panchangam published by Sringeri Sharada Peetham.

Construction of a fourth-order most-perfect magic square from a Latin square with distinct diagonals, M, and its transpose, M^{T}.

Two 12 × 12 most-perfect magic squares can be obtained adding 1 to each element of:

       [,1] [,2] [,3] [,4] [,5] [,6] [,7] [,8] [,9] [,10] [,11] [,12]
 [1,]   64   92   81   94   48   77   67   63   50    61    83    78
 [2,]   31   99   14   97   47  114   28  128   45   130    12   113
 [3,]   24  132   41  134    8  117   27  103   10   101    43   118
 [4,]   23  107    6  105   39  122   20  136   37   138     4   121
 [5,]   16  140   33  142    0  125   19  111    2   109    35   126
 [6,]   75   55   58   53   91   70   72   84   89    86    56    69
 [7,]   76   80   93   82   60   65   79   51   62    49    95    66
 [8,]  115   15   98   13  131   30  112   44  129    46    96    29
 [9,]  116   40  133   42  100   25  119   11  102     9   135    26
[10,]  123    7  106    5  139   22  120   36  137    38   104    21
[11,]  124   32  141   34  108   17  127    3  110     1   143    18
[12,]   71   59   54   57   87   74   68   88   85    90    52    73

       [,1] [,2] [,3] [,4] [,5] [,6] [,7] [,8] [,9] [,10] [,11] [,12]
 [1,]    4  113   14  131    3  121   31  138   21   120    32   130
 [2,]  136   33  126   15  137   25  109    8  119    26   108    16
 [3,]   73   44   83   62   72   52  100   69   90    51   101    61
 [4,]   64  105   54   87   65   97   37   80   47    98    36    88
 [5,]    1  116   11  134    0  124   28  141   18   123    29   133
 [6,]  103   66   93   48  104   58   76   41   86    59    75    49
 [7,]  112    5  122   23  111   13  139   30  129    12   140    22
 [8,]   34  135   24  117   35  127    7  110   17   128     6   118
 [9,]   43   74   53   92   42   82   70   99   60    81    71    91
[10,]  106   63   96   45  107   55   79   38   89    56    78    46
[11,]  115    2  125   20  114   10  142   27  132     9   143    19
[12,]   67  102   57   84   68   94   40   77   50    95    39    85

== Properties ==
All most-perfect magic squares are panmagic squares.

Apart from the trivial case of the first order square, most-perfect magic squares are all of order 4n. In their book, Kathleen Ollerenshaw and David S. Brée give a method of construction and enumeration of all most-perfect magic squares. They also show that there is a one-to-one correspondence between reversible squares and most-perfect magic squares.

For n = 36, there are about 2.7 × 10^{44} essentially different most-perfect magic squares.
