= List of amateur mathematicians =

This is a list of amateur mathematicians—people whose primary vocation did not involve mathematics (or any similar discipline) yet made notable, and sometimes important, contributions to the field of mathematics.

- Ahmes (scribe)
- Ashutosh Mukherjee (lawyer)
- Robert Ammann (programmer and postal worker)
- John Arbuthnot (surgeon and author)
- Jean-Robert Argand (shopkeeper)
- Leon Bankoff (dentist)
- Rev. Thomas Bayes (Presbyterian minister)
- Andrew Beal (businessman)
- Isaac Beeckman (candlemaker)
- Chester Ittner Bliss (biologist)
- Napoléon Bonaparte (general)
- Mary Everest Boole (homemaker, librarian)
- William Bourne (innkeeper)
- Nathaniel Bowditch (indentured bookkeeper)
- Achille Brocot (clockmaker)
- Jost Bürgi (clockmaker)
- Marvin Ray Burns (veteran)
- Gerolamo Cardano (medical doctor)
- D. G. Champernowne (college student)
- Thomas Clausen (technical assistant)
- Cleo (software developer)
- Sir James Cockle (judge)
- Federico Commandino (medical doctor)
- William Crabtree (merchant)
- Nathan Daboll (cooper)
- Henri Delannoy (army officer)
- Felix Delastelle (bonded warehouseman)
- Martin Demaine (goldsmith and glass artist)
- Humphry Ditton (minister)
- Harvey Dubner (engineer)
- Henry Dudeney (civil servant)
- Albrecht Dürer (painter)
- Greg Egan (writer)
- M. C. Escher (graphic artist)
- Eugène Ehrhart (mathematics teacher)
- John Ernest (painter)
- Pasquale Joseph Federico (patent attorney)
- Pierre de Fermat (lawyer)
- Sarah Flannery (high school student)
- Reo Fortune (anthropologist)
- John G.F. Francis (research assistant)
- Benjamin Franklin (printer and diplomat)
- Bernard Frenicle de Bessy
- Gemma Frisius (medical doctor)
- Britney Gallivan (high school student)
- James Garfield (United States President)
- Antoine Gombaud (essayist)
- Thorold Gosset (lawyer)
- Jørgen Pedersen Gram (actuary)
- Hermann Grassmann (school teacher)
- John Graunt (haberdasher)
- George Green (miller)
- Aubrey de Grey (gerontologist)
- André-Michel Guerry (lawyer)
- Charles James Hargreave (judge)
- Oliver Heaviside (telegraph operator)
- Kurt Heegner (private scholar)
- John R. Hendricks (meteorologist)
- Anthony Hill (painter)
- Paul Jaccard (botanist)
- Alfred Bray Kempe (lawyer)
- Thomas Kirkman (church rector)
- Laurence Monroe Klauber (herpetologist)
- Harry Lindgren (civil servant)
- Ada Lovelace (countess)
- Lu Jiaxi (high school physics teacher)
- Kenneth McIntyre (lawyer)
- Danica McKellar (actress)
- Anderson Gray McKendrick (medical doctor)
- Marin Mersenne (theologian)
- George Phillips Odom Jr. (artist)
- B. Nicolò I. Paganini (schoolboy)
- Pāṇini (linguist)
- Blaise Pascal (heir, private scholar)
- Padmakumar (technician)
- Henry Perigal (stockbroker)
- Kenneth Perko (lawyer)
- Ivan Pervushin (priest)
- Piero della Francesca (painter)
- Pingala (musician)
- William Playfair (draftsman)
- Henry Cabourn Pocklington (schoolmaster)
- George R. Price (population geneticist)
- François Proth (farmer)
- Ramchundra (head master)
- Marjorie Rice (homemaker)
- Olinde Rodrigues (banker, social reformer)
- Lee Sallows (engineer)
- Robert Schlaifer (classics scholar)
- Robert Schneider (musician and record producer)
- William Shanks (landlord)
- Abraham Sharp (schoolmaster)
- David Smith (retired printer)
- Simon Stevin (merchants clerk)
- Alicia Boole Stott (secretary)
- Paul Tannery (tobacco factory director)
- Gaston Tarry (civil servant)
- Niccolò Fontana Tartaglia (bookkeeper)
- Nikola Tesla (engineer, inventor)
- Sébastien Truchet (monk)
- Franciscus Vieta (lawyer)
- Giordano Vitale (soldier)
- Walter Frank Raphael Weldon (evolutionary biologist)
- Johannes Werner (parish priest)
- Caspar Wessel (lawyer)
- Leo Wiener (linguist)
- Frank Wilcoxon (chemist)
- Edouard Zeckendorf (medical doctor)
