= John R. Hendricks =

Canadian mathematician

John Robert Hendricks (September 4, 1929 – July 7, 2007) was a Canadian amateur mathematician notable for his work in magic squares and hypercubes. He published many articles in the Journal of Recreational Mathematics as well as other mathematics-related journals.

== Early life, education and career ==
Hendricks was born in Regina, Saskatchewan, in 1929, moving with his family to Vancouver, British Columbia, at an early age.

He attended the University of British Columbia and graduated with a B.A. in mathematics.

He began his career as a meteorology instructor in the NATO flight training program, and was subsequently employed for 33 years by the Canadian Meteorological Service, until his retirement in Winnipeg, Manitoba, in 1984.

Hendricks volunteered for groups including the Monarchist League of Canada and the Manitoba Provincial Council, Duke of Edinburgh's Award in Canada. He received the Canada 125 medal for his volunteer work.

== Amateur mathematician ==
When he was 13, Hendricks started collecting magic squares. As his interest in mathematics grew, so did his love of magic squares, and cubes.

His interest in magic squares led to higher dimensions: magic cubes, tesseracts, etc. He developed a new diagram for the four-dimensional tesseract. This was published in 1962 when he showed constructions of four-, five-, and six-dimensional magic hypercubes of order three. He later was the first to publish diagrams of all 58 magic tesseracts of order 3.

Hendricks was also an authority on the design of inlaid magic squares and cubes (and in 1999, a magic tesseract). Following his retirement, he gave many public lectures on magic squares and cubes in schools and in-service teacher's conventions in Canada and the northern United States. He also developed a course on magic squares and cubes which he conducted for seven years at Acadia Junior High School in Winnipeg.

== Later years ==
In April 1996, Hendricks and his wife Celia moved to Victoria, British Columbia. By this time, he was suffering from Parkinson's disease that meant he had difficulty walking or writing. He purchased a personal computer to help with his self-published work on magic hypercubes, which until this point he had carried out using only a programmable calculator. Despite his deteriorating health, Hendricks continued his work with magic hypercubes, achieving during this time: the first perfect magic tesseract (order 16), in April 1999; the first order 32 perfect magic tesseract; the first inlaid magic tesseract (order 6 with inlaid order 3) in October 1999; and the first bimagic cube (order 25), June 2000.

In 2004, Hendricks was unable to continue with his mathematical work due to ill health. He died in Victoria in 2007, aged 77.

== Self-published work after 1998 ==
- Magic Squares to Tesseract by Computer, 1998, 0-9684700-0-9
- Inlaid Magic Squares and Cubes, 1999, 0-9684700-1-7
- Perfect n-Dimensional Magic Hypercubes of Order 2n, 1999, 0-9684700-4-1
- All Third-Order Magic Tesseracts, 1999, 0-9684700-2-5
- Bi-Magic Squares of Order 9, 1999, 0-9684700-6-8
- Curves and Approximations, 1999, 0-9684700-5-X An Inlaid Magic Tesseract, 1999, as a 17" x 22" poster OR an 8-page self-cover booklet
- Inlaid Magic Squares and Cubes (2nd edition), 2000, 0-9684700-3-3
- A Bimagic Cube of Order 25, 2000, 0-9684700-7-6
- Magic Square Lexicon: Illustrated (co-author Harvey Heinz), HDH, 2000, 0-9687985-0-0

Through his life, Hendricks published 53 articles and papers on magic squares and cubes, 14 articles on statistics, 15 articles on meteorology, 14 miscellaneous articles and 12 books. A collection of his notes, a CD, and a copy of each of his books, has been added to the Strens Recreational Mathematics Collection at the University of Calgary, including all of the books above, which are now out-of-print.

== See also ==
- Magic cube class
- Magic hypercubes
- Perfect magic cube
