= Pantriagonal magic cube =

A pantriagonal magic cube is a magic cube where all 4m^{2} pantriagonals sum correctly. There are 4 one-segment pantriagonals, 12(m − 1) two-segment pantriagonals, and 4(m − 2)(m − 1) three-segment pantriagonals. This class of magic cubes may contain some simple magic squares and/or pandiagonal magic squares, but not enough to satisfy any other classifications.

The magic constant for magic cubes is S = m(m^{3} + 1)/2.

A proper pantriagonal magic cube has 7m^{2} lines summing correctly. It contains no magic squares.

The smallest pantriagonal magic cube has order 4. A pantriagonal magic cube is the 3-dimensional equivalent of the pandiagonal magic square – instead of the ability to move a line from one edge to the opposite edge of the square with it remaining magic, you can move a plane from one edge to the other.

== See also ==
- Magic cube classes
- triagonal
