= Broken diagonal =

In recreational mathematics and the theory of magic squares, a broken diagonal is a set of n cells forming two parallel diagonal lines in the square. Alternatively, these two lines can be thought of as wrapping around the boundaries of the square to form a single sequence.

== In pandiagonal magic squares ==
A magic square in which the broken diagonals have the same sum as the rows, columns, and diagonals is called a pandiagonal magic square.

The six broken diagonals of the following number square are: 3,12,14,5; 10,1,7,16; 10,13,7,4; 15,8,2,9; 15,12,2,5; and 6,13,11,4.

The fact that this square is a pandiagonal magic square can be verified by checking that all of its broken diagonals add up to the same constant:

3+12+14+5 = 34

10+1+7+16 = 34

10+13+7+4 = 34

One way to visualize a broken diagonal is to imagine a "ghost image" of the panmagic square adjacent to the original:

The set of numbers {3, 12, 14, 5} of a broken diagonal, wrapped around the original square, can be seen starting with the first square of the ghost image and moving down to the left.

== In linear algebra ==
Broken diagonals are used in a formula to find the determinant of 3 by 3 matrices.

For a 3 × 3 matrix A, its determinant is

$$\begin{align}
|A| = \begin{vmatrix} a & b & c \\ d & e & f \\ g & h & i \end{vmatrix}
&= a\,\begin{vmatrix} \Box & \Box & \Box \\ \Box & e & f \\ \Box & h & i \end{vmatrix} -
b\,\begin{vmatrix} \Box & \Box & \Box \\ d & \Box & f \\ g & \Box & i \end{vmatrix} +
c\,\begin{vmatrix} \Box & \Box & \Box \\ d & e & \Box \\ g & h & \Box \end{vmatrix} \\[3pt]
&= a\,\begin{vmatrix} e & f \\ h & i \end{vmatrix} -
b\,\begin{vmatrix} d & f \\ g & i \end{vmatrix} +
c\,\begin{vmatrix} d & e \\ g & h \end{vmatrix} \\[3pt]
&= aei + bfg + cdh - ceg - bdi - afh.
\end{align}$$

Here, $bfg, cdh, bdi,$ and $afh$ are (products of the elements of) the broken diagonals of the matrix.

Broken diagonals are used in the calculation of the determinants of all matrices of size 3 × 3 or larger. This can be shown by using the matrix's minors to calculate the determinant.
