= Simple magic cube =

An example of a 3 × 3 × 3 simple magic cube.

A simple magic cube is the lowest of six basic classes of magic cubes. These classes are based on extra features required.

The simple magic cube requires only the basic features a cube requires to be magic. Namely, all lines parallel to the faces, and all 4 space diagonals sum correctly. i.e. all "1-agonals" and all "3-agonals" sum to

$$S = \frac{m(m^3+1)}{2}.$$

No planar diagonals (2-agonals) are required to sum correctly, so there are probably no magic squares in the cube.

== See also ==
- Magic square
- Magic cube classes
