= Space diagonal =

Line connecting two vertices that are not on the same face

AC' (shown in blue) is a space diagonal, while AC (shown in red) is a face diagonal.

In geometry, a space diagonal (also interior diagonal or body diagonal) of a polyhedron is a line connecting two vertices that are not on the same face. Space diagonals contrast with face diagonals, which connect vertices on the same face (but not on the same edge) as each other.

For example, a pyramid has no space diagonals, while a cube (shown at right) or more generally a parallelepiped has four space diagonals.

== Axial diagonal ==
An axial diagonal is a space diagonal that passes through the center of a polyhedron.

For example, in a cube with edge length a, all four space diagonals are axial diagonals, of common length $a\sqrt {3}.$ More generally, a cuboid with edge lengths a, b, and c has all four space diagonals axial, with common length $\sqrt{a^2+b^2+c^2}.$

A regular octahedron has 3 axial diagonals, of length $a\sqrt {2}$, with edge length a.

A regular icosahedron has 6 axial diagonals of length $a\sqrt {2+\varphi}$, where $\varphi$ is the golden ratio $(1+\sqrt 5)/2$.

== Space diagonals of magic cubes ==
A magic square is an arrangement of numbers in a square grid so that the sum of the numbers along every row, column, and diagonal is the same. Similarly, one may define a magic cube to be an arrangement of numbers in a cubical grid so that the sum of the numbers on the four space diagonals must be the same as the sum of the numbers in each row, each column, and each pillar.

== See also ==
- Distance
- Face diagonal
- Hypotenuse
- Magic cube classes
- Spacetime interval
