= List of Korean inventions and discoveries =

This is a list of Korean inventions and discoveries; Koreans have made contributions to science and technology from ancient to modern times.

== Agriculture ==
- Cheugugi

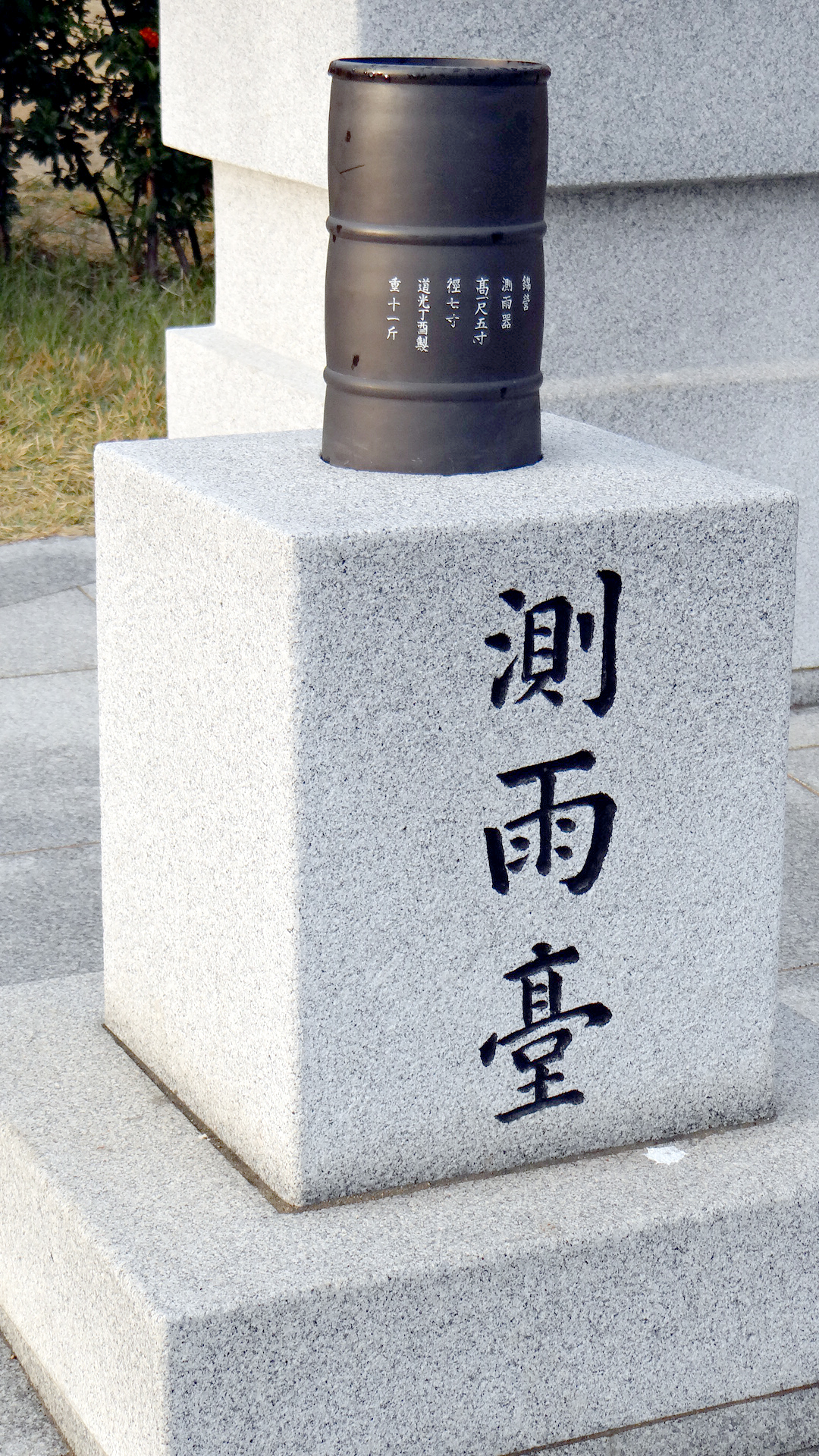
A Cheugugi at Jang Yeong-sil Science Garden in Busan

The first standardized rain gauge, called the cheugugi, was invented during the reign of Sejong the Great in the Joseon dynasty of Korea. The cheugugi was used throughout the country for official purposes. In the 15th century, Korea was the only country to use a quantitative measuring device for the purpose of meteorological observation.

- Heated greenhouse

The first description of a heated greenhouse is from the Sanga Yorok, a treatise on husbandry compiled by a royal physician of the Joseon dynasty of Korea during the 1450s, in its chapter on cultivating vegetables during winter. The treatise contains detailed instructions on constructing a greenhouse that is capable of cultivating vegetables, forcing flowers, and ripening fruit within an artificially heated environment, by utilizing ondol, the traditional Korean underfloor heating system, to maintain heat and humidity; cob walls to insulate heat; and semi-transparent oiled hanji windows to permit light penetration for plant growth and provide protection from the outside environment. The Annals of the Joseon Dynasty confirm that greenhouse-like structures incorporating ondol were constructed to provide heat for mandarin orange trees during the winter of 1438.

- Korean hand plow

The homi, which dates back to the Bronze Age, is one of the most representative agricultural tools of Korea. Its signature tapered blade was developed during the Later Silla period. In recent times, the homi (known by names such as the "Ho-Mi EZ Digger" and "Korean hand plow") has gained popularity in the West.

- Soybean cultivation

The first unambiguously domesticated, cultigen-sized soybean was discovered in Korea at the Mumun-period Daundong site.

== Aquaculture ==
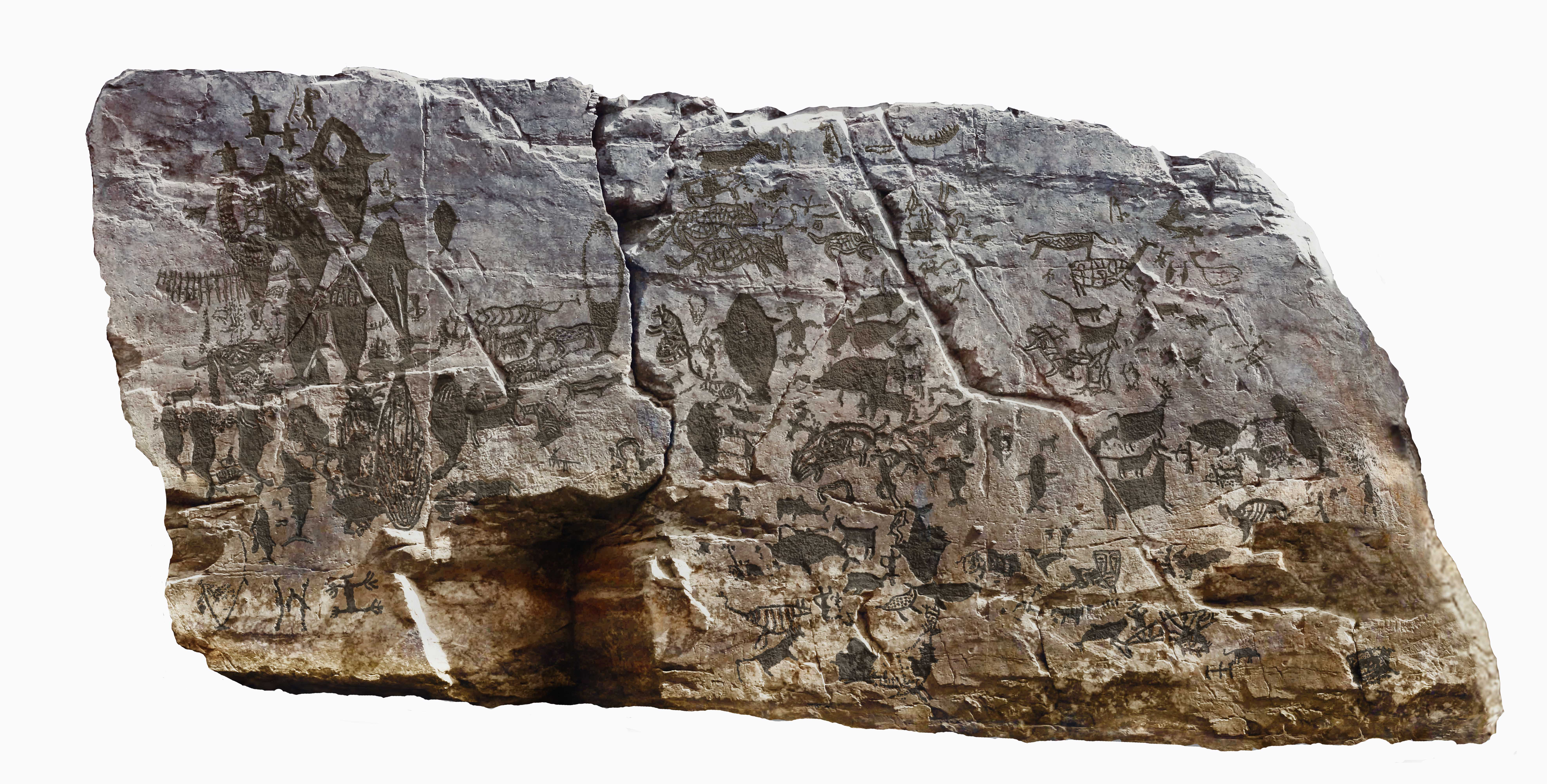
Bangudae petroglyphs

- Fishing net

Limestone net sinkers discovered in Korea dating to 27,000 BC are the earliest evidence of fishing by nets and also the oldest fishing implements found to date in the world.

- Seaweed farming

The earliest cultivation of gim, an edible seaweed, was started by Kim Yeo-ik (김여익; 金汝瀷) in the middle of the 17th century.

- Whaling

The earliest depictions of whaling have been discovered in Korea at the Neolithic Bangudae site, which may date back to 6000 BC. Bangudae is the earliest evidence for whaling.

== Mathematics ==
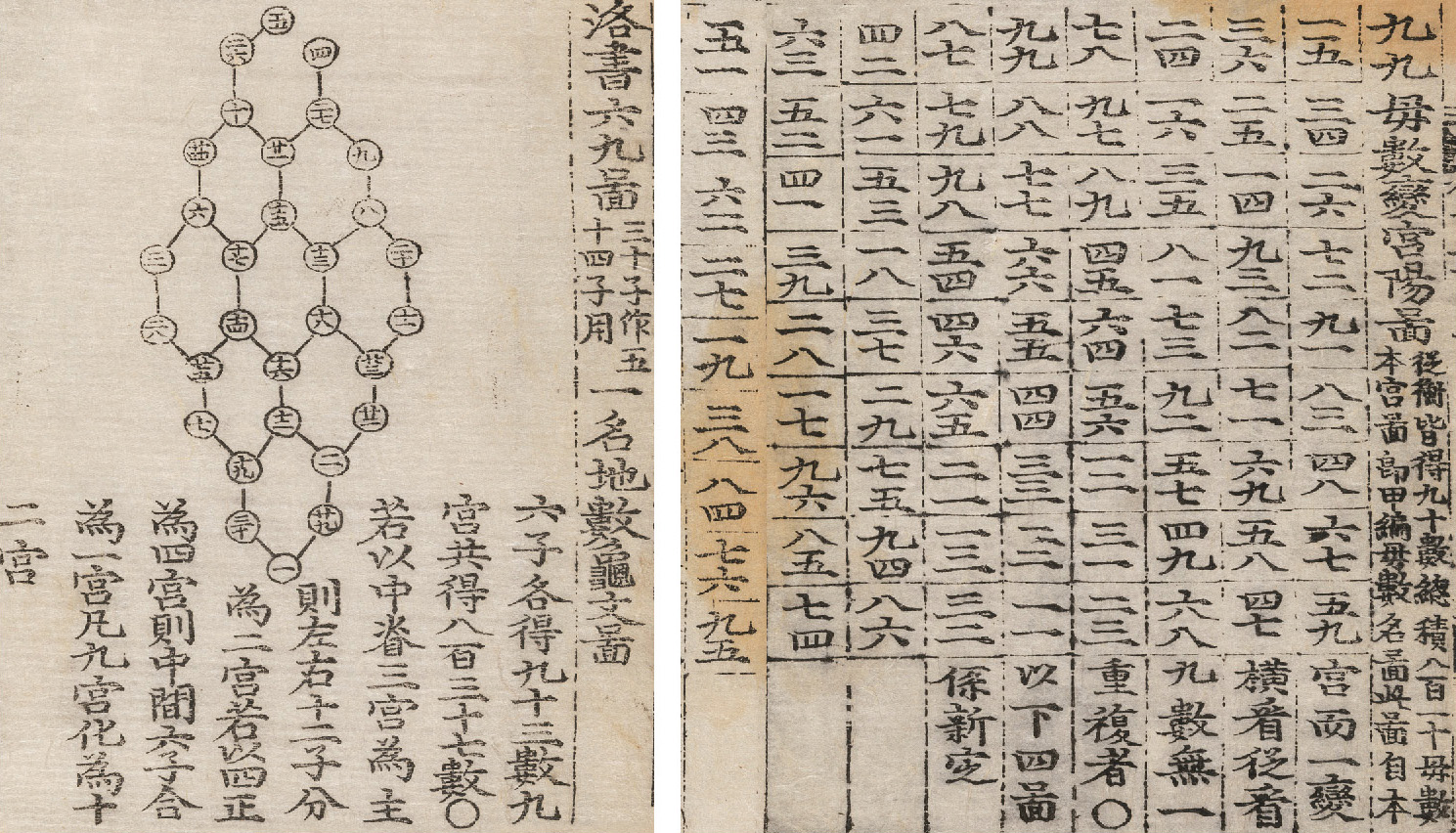
Gusuryak by Choi Seok-jeong, published in 1700

- Chisanbop

Chisanbop is an abacus-like calculation system using fingers that was invented in Korea in the 1940s and brought to the West in the 1970s.

- Hexagonal tortoise problem

The hexagonal tortoise problem (지수귀문도; 地數龜文圖) was invented by Choi Seok-jeong during the Joseon period.

- Latin square

The first literature on the Latin square dates back to the monograph Gusuryak (구수략; 九數略) by the Joseon mathematician Choi Seok-jeong (1646–1715), predating Leonhard Euler by at least 67 years.

== Science ==
=== Social science ===
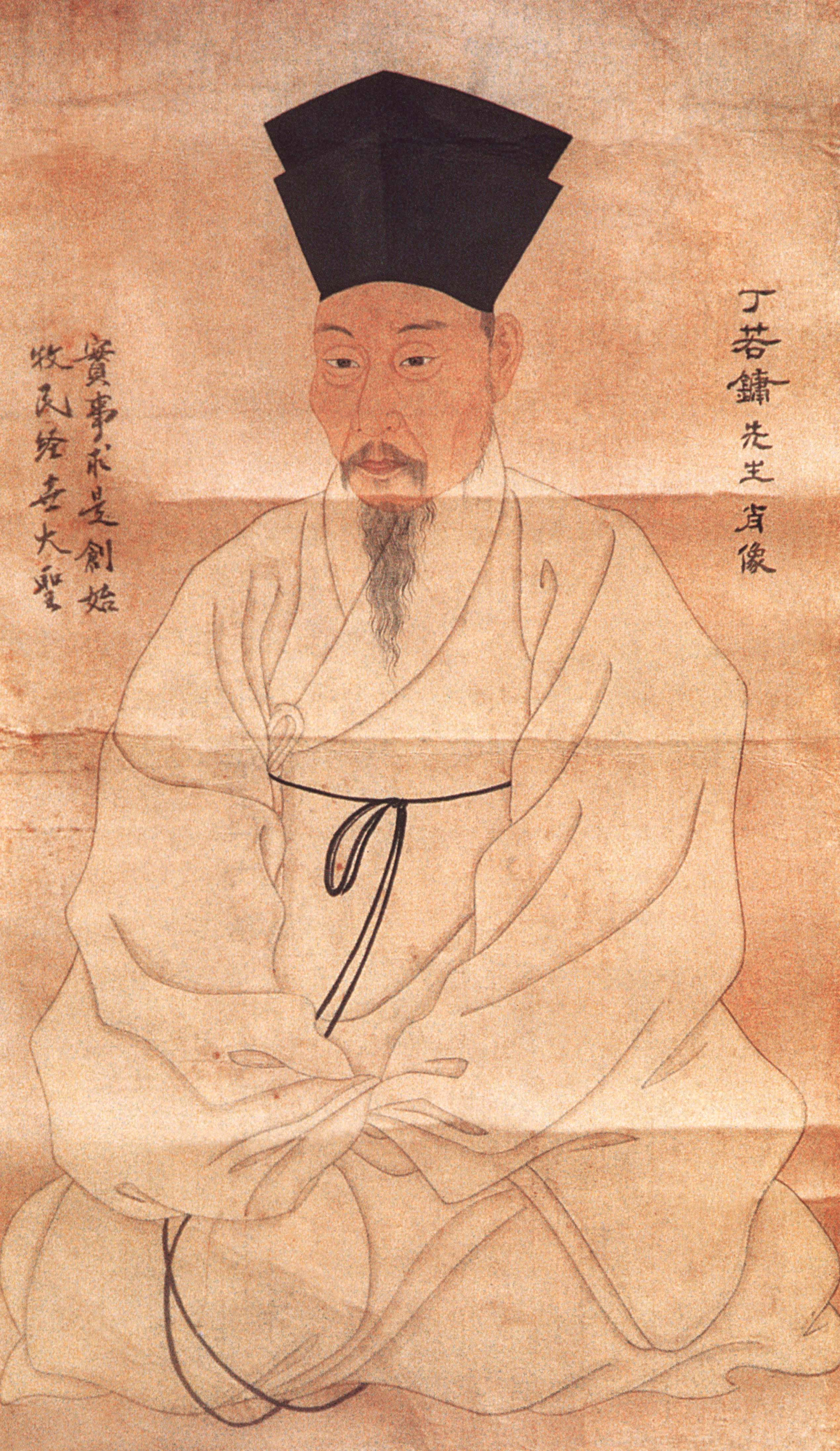
Chŏng Yagyong, a proponent of Silhak

- Double-entry bookkeeping system

It is believed that the world's first double-entry bookkeeping system, called the sagae chibubeop, was developed in Goryeo and used by merchants in the capital of Kaesong, a center of trade and industry, at least two centuries earlier than in Italy.

- Public opinion polling

In order to provide equality and fairness in taxation for the common people, Sejong the Great issued a royal decree to administer a nationwide public opinion poll regarding a new tax system called Gongbeop in 1430. Over the course of 5 months, the poll surveyed 172,806 people, of which approximately 57% responded with approval for the proposed reform.

- Society for the disabled

The world's first society for the disabled, called the myeongtongsi (명통시; 明通寺), was created by the Joseon government during the early Joseon period. The government-organized myeongtongsi regularly held events for the blind to participate in rituals and ceremonies and receive treatment for illnesses, donations of food and other items, and training for certain jobs.

- Parental leave

In 1426, Sejong the Great enacted a law that granted government nobi women 100 days of maternity leave after childbirth, which, in 1430, was lengthened by one month before childbirth. In 1434, Sejong also granted the husbands 30 days of paternity leave.

- Silhak

Silhak, also known as "Practical Learning", is a Korean school of thought developed by the seonbi that is dedicated to an empirical approach to statecraft based on pragmatism, instead of a blind and uncritical adherence to Confucianism. Silhak scholars, such as Chŏng Yagyong, emphasized human equality and advocated economic, educational, and social reform.

=== Life science ===
- Triangle of U

In 1935, the Korean-Japanese plant scientist Woo Jang-choon proposed the Triangle of U, named after himself, which describes the evolution and relationships between members of the plant genus Brassica.

== Architecture ==
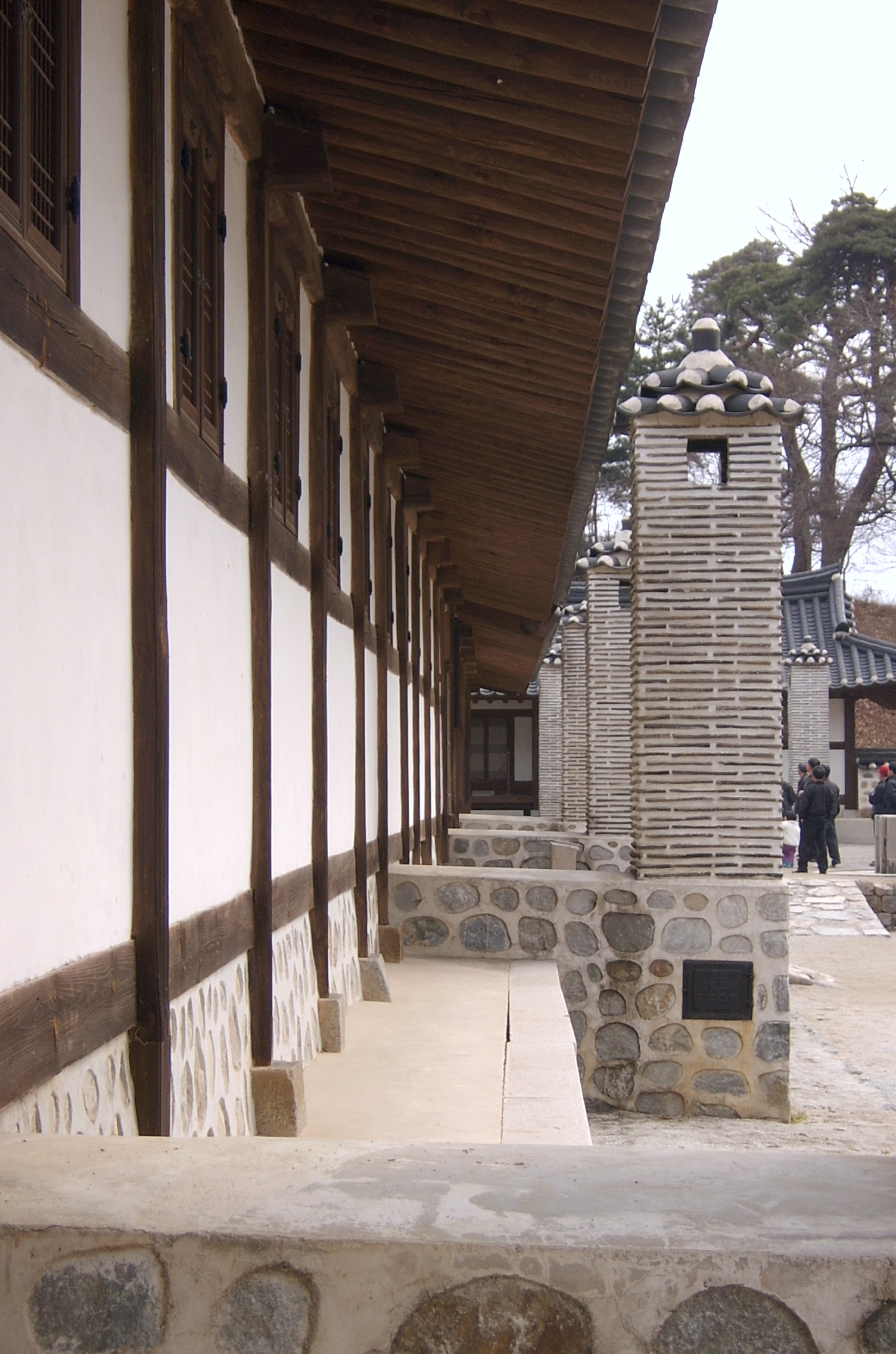
In the ondol system, heat and smoke from the kitchen stove circulates under the building, warming the floors, then exits through the chimneys.

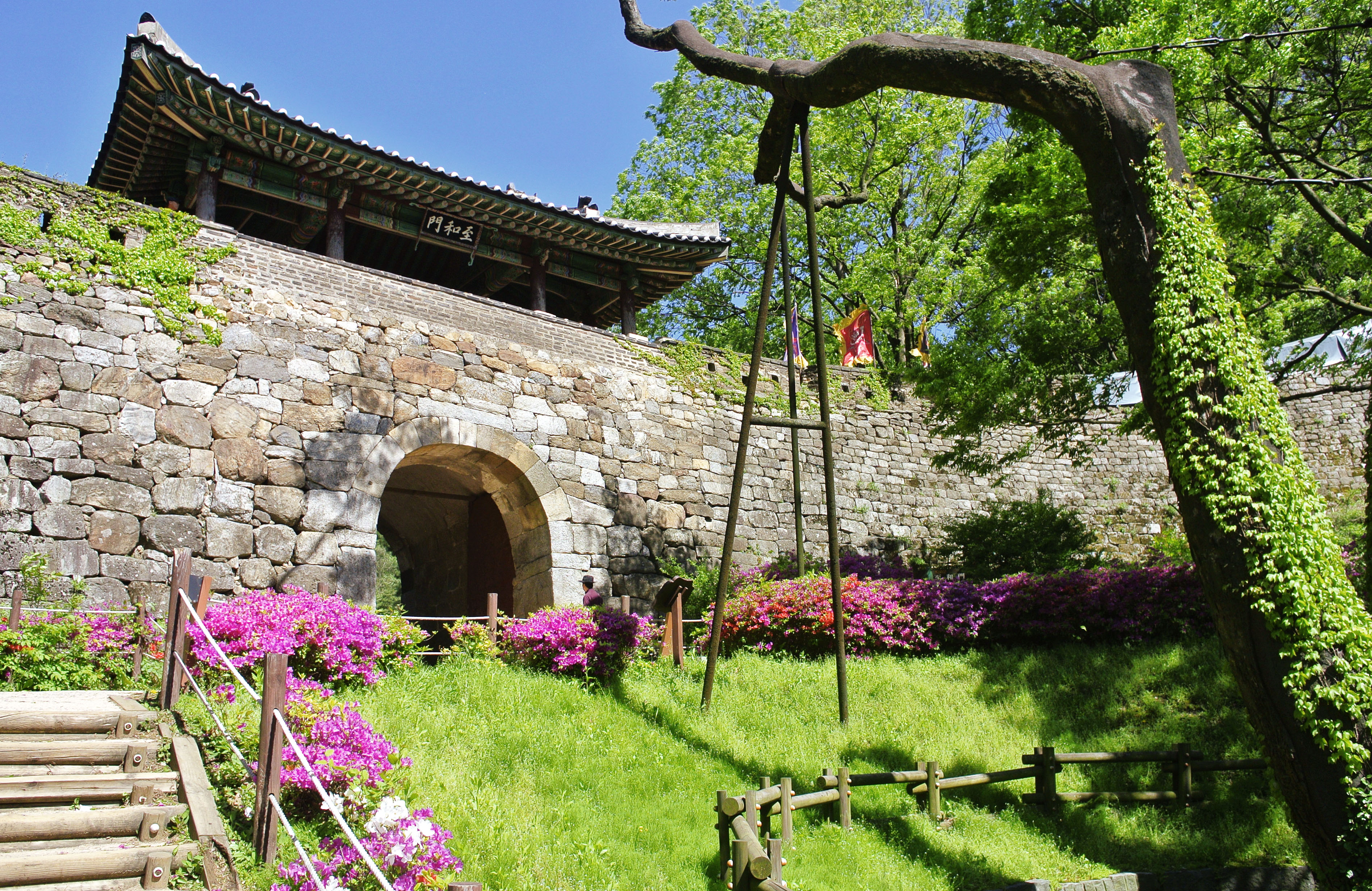
Namhan Mountain Fortress

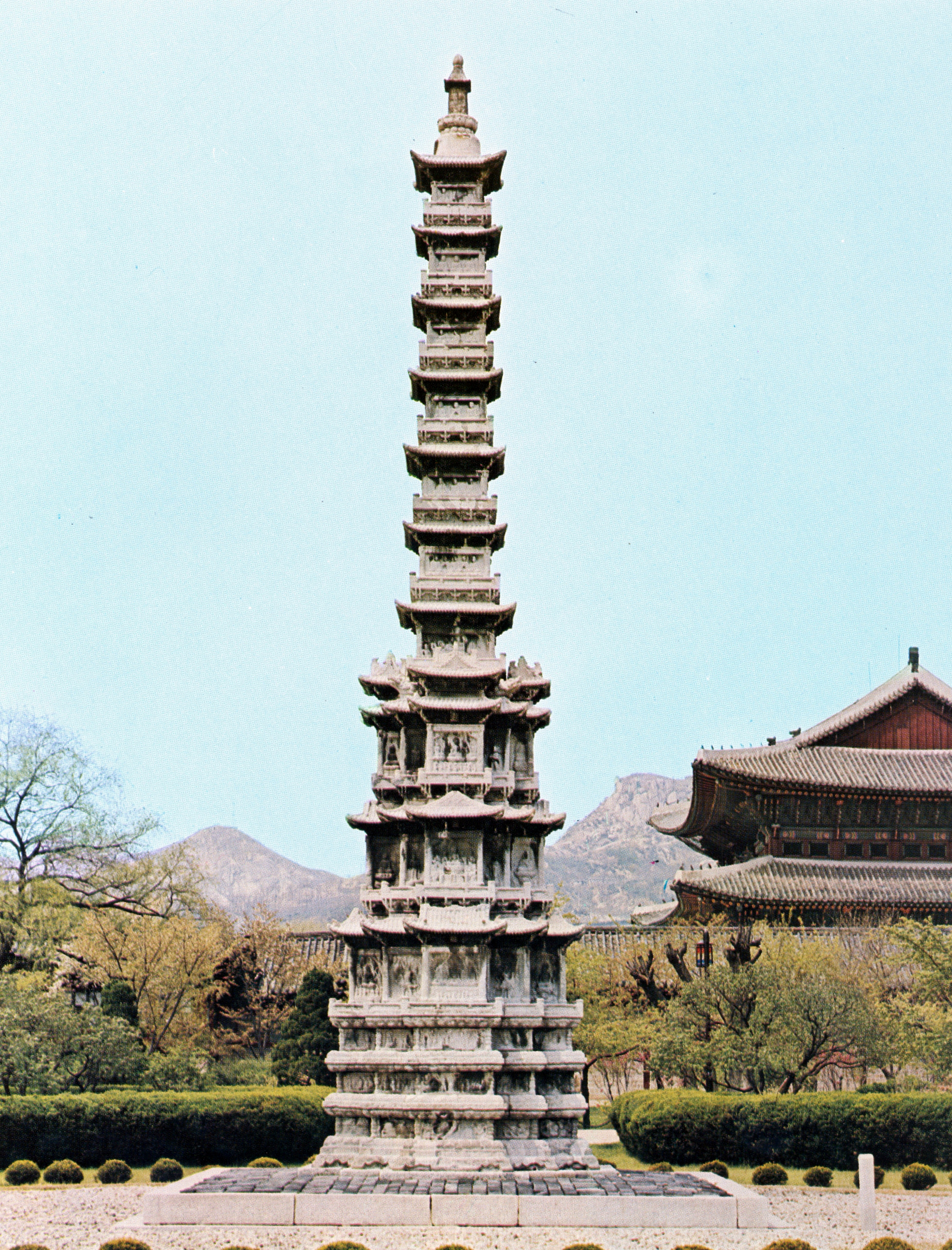
Gyeongcheonsa Pagoda

- Ondol

One of the earliest systems of underfloor heating, dating back 2,500 years, was invented and widely used by Koreans. The Korean ondol heating system was thought to be the oldest of its kind until the recent archaeological discovery of a similar heating system in the Alaskan Aleutian Islands. However, the archaeologist who discovered it agrees with Korean researchers that the two systems developed independently, based on the distance of 5,000 kilometers and the absence of ondol in the areas between them. Some Korean researchers have explained this phenomenon by hypothesizing that a whale-hunting people from the Korean Peninsula migrated by sea to Alaska during prehistoric times. Inspired by the Korean ondol hydronic radiant floor heating system, the American architect Frank Lloyd Wright developed and introduced the first "radiant heating system" using hot water pipes.

- Seokbinggo

The ancient Silla kingdom created an early refrigeration system called seokbinggo, which were subterranean chambers used to store ice and food.

- Korean fortress

Koreans developed a unique and distinct fortress tradition. Korean fortresses were based on a stone culture and built with stones on natural mountainous terrain; therefore, they are conceptually completely different compared to Chinese fortresses, which were based on an earth culture and built with bricks and stamped earth on flat land. Korean fortresses were invented by Goguryeo and spread to Baekje and Silla, and then inherited and further developed by Goryeo and then Joseon. Goguryeo fortress ruins have been found in about 170 sites to date, including in China; one of the most notable among them is Ansi Fortress, which successfully defended against Tang Taizong during the Goguryeo–Tang War. Korea, beginning with Goguryeo, has been called "a country of fortresses"; almost 2,400 mountain fortress sites have been found in Korea. Korean-style fortresses can also be found in Japan, which were constructed and supervised by immigrants of Baekje origin.

- Korean pagoda

Koreans created a unique and distinct pagoda tradition using stone. Pagodas were created in India using earth, then in China using wood, which spread to the Three Kingdoms of Korea, and then Japan; however, the pagoda tradition of East Asia diverged, with China creating pagodas using bricks, Korea creating pagodas using stone, and Japan continuing to use wood. Korean stone pagodas were first created in Baekje during the early 7th century and then inherited by Later Silla; 90% of the pagodas in Later Silla were made of stone. The stone pagoda tradition was propagated by the great abundance of high quality granite in Korea, which also led to other granite creations such as the Seokguram and Cheomseongdae. Goryeo, a devoutly Buddhist state, also inherited the stone pagoda tradition.

== Astronomy ==
- Cheonsang Yeolcha Bunyajido

The earliest known constellation patterns in Korea can be found on dolmens dating back to 3000 BC. The Cheonsang Yeolcha Bunyajido is a planisphere inscribed on black marble that was completed in 1395 during the reign of King Taejo; according to its inscription, it is based on a star chart from ancient Goguryeo that was lost during wartime. It is known as the world's second oldest star chart engraved in stone, after the Chinese Suzhou Star Chart of 1247. However, the Cheonsang Yeolcha Bunyajido's stellar positions indicate an epoch dating back to the first century CE, thus making it the oldest actual representation of the stars in the world.

- Cheomseongdae

The Cheomseongdae is the oldest surviving astronomical observatory in Asia, and possibly the world. It was constructed in Seorabeol, the capital of Silla, during the reign of Queen Seondeok in the 7th century. Modeled on Baekje's Jeomseongdae, which now exists only in historical records, the Cheomseongdae influenced the construction of a Japanese observatory in 675, and Duke Zhou's observatory in China in 723.

== Writing ==
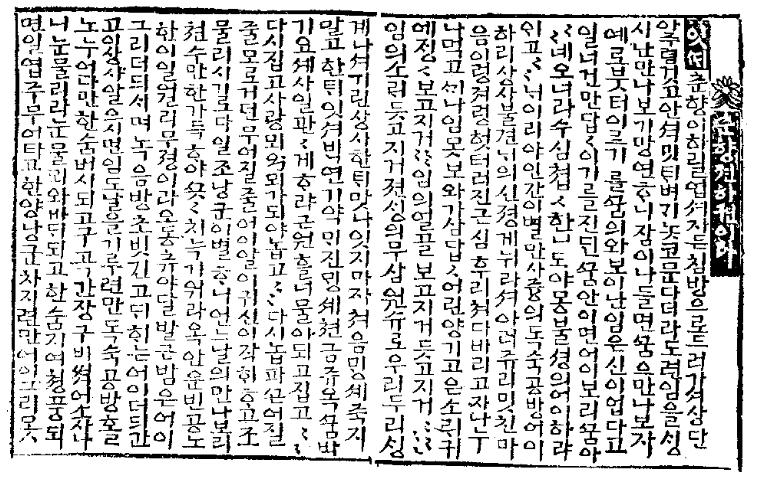
The Tale of Chunhyang in Hangul

- Featural writing system

Hangul is the world's first featural writing system, wherein the shapes of the letters are not arbitrary, but encode phonological features of the phonemes they represent. The Korean alphabet is unique among the world's writing systems, in that it combines aspects of featural, phonemic, and syllabic representation. Hangul, originally named Hunminjeongeum, was personally created by Sejong the Great to promote literacy among the common people.

- Phonemic orthography

Predating the creation of Hangul by hundreds of years, Koreans created various phonetic writing systems that were used in conjunction with Hanja, including idu, hyangchal, gugyeol, and gakpil. Some of them may have influenced the development of kana in Japan.

== Printing ==
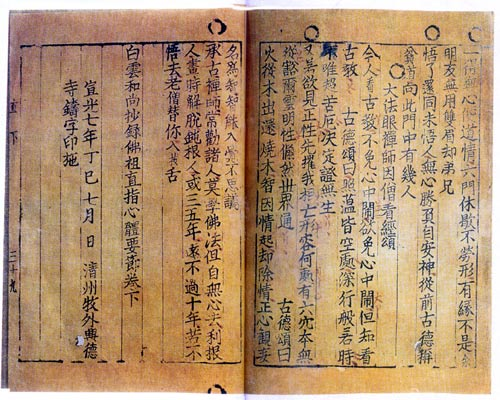
Jikji, the oldest surviving book printed with movable metal type

- Movable metal printing press

The movable metal printing press was invented in the early thirteenth century in Goryeo (modern Korea); predating its introduction to Europe and presentation of the technology to the rest of the world by Johannes Gutenberg by over two centuries. The first ever book to be printed with the movable metal printing press was the Prescribed Ritual Texts of the Past and Present in 1234 during the Goryeo period. The earliest surviving book to be printed with movable metal type is Jikji, dated to 1377. The first lead type in the world is the Byeongjinja, created in 1436. Metal types were called juja (cast characters), and the Joseon government operated the jujaso bureau, a continuation of Goryeo's seojeogwon, to print books and documents to be distributed to the central and local administrations, village schools, scholars, and officials.

- Newspaper

The Jobo, which is discussed in the Annals of the Joseon Dynasty, is possibly the oldest newspaper in the world. Published in 1577, the Jobo was a privately run commercial newspaper, printed daily, that covered a range of topics, including weather, constellations, and current affairs. In 2017, a Korean monk claimed to have discovered an extant copy of the Jobo.

== Metallurgy ==
- Haifukiho

Haifukiho (灰吹法, "ash-blowing method"), also known in Korea as the lead–silver separation method (Korean: 연은분리법; Hanja: 鉛銀分離法), is a cupellation technique for extracting silver from lead-bearing ore. An early Korean record appears in the Annals of the Joseon Dynasty in 1503, when Kim Gambul and Kim Geomdong presented a method for smelting lead to obtain silver. The method was introduced to Japan via Korea in 1533 and used at the Iwami Ginzan Silver Mine, where it greatly increased Japanese silver production.

== Military ==
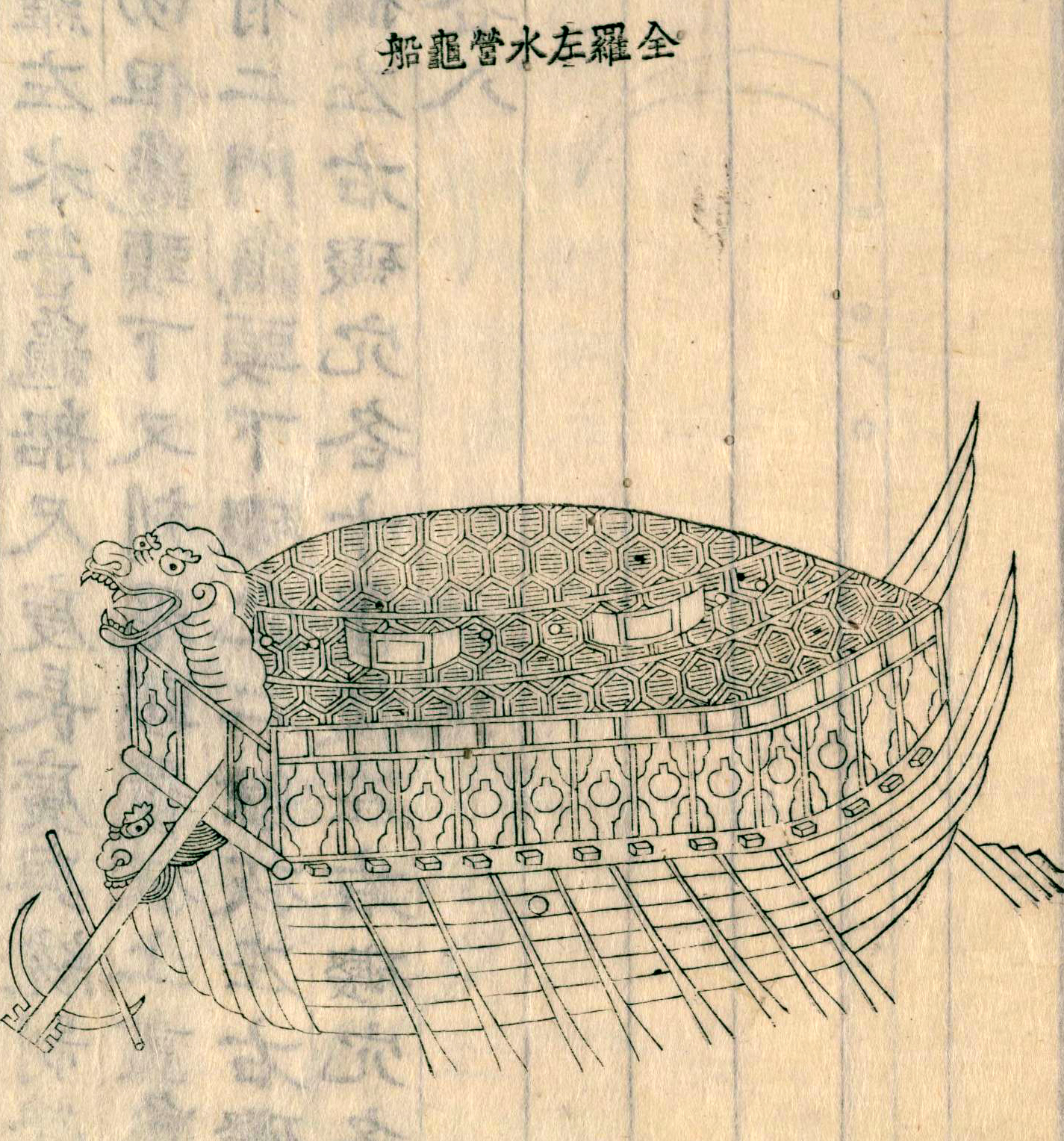
18th century depiction of the geobukseon

- Iron plate armor

Iron plate armor was used by Silla and Gaya beginning in the early 4th century. According to the Gyeongju National Museum, "The armor excavated from historic sites in Gujeongdong is plate armor, consisting of a number of long iron plates vertically linked with one another, a feature that is unique to armor found on the Korean Peninsula."

- Pistol

The "se-chongtong" was a handheld firearm that was developed in 1432 for use against the Jurchens. It measured 13.8cm, weighed 135g, and was held by a handle that worked like pliers that allowed spent barrels to be replaced with loaded ones. According to the Silok, it was convenient enough to be fired in succession by horsemen carrying multiple barrels, and during times of emergency, even women and children could use it easily.

- Hwacha

The hwacha is a mobile multiple rocket launcher that uses gunpowder to fire up to 200 singijeon rockets at one time. The hwacha was invented in 1409, but saw its greatest use during the Imjin War, most famously in the Battle of Haengju. Hwachas were used against both land and sea targets.

- Airplane

The bigeo or bicha (비거, 비차) was a primitive airplane that was used during the Imjin War. It could fly 30 Ri or about 11 kilometers, and was allegedly powered by gunpowder. It saw service during the first and second sieges of Jinju.

- Naval artillery

The Koreans were innovators in the development of naval artillery, and produced the most advanced naval cannons in East Asia. In 1380, 100 Goryeo ships armed with gunpowder weapons destroyed 500 Wokou ships at the Battle of Jinpo.

- Armored warship

The turtle ship, also known as the geobukseon, was the first armored warship in the world. Turtle ships were built during the Joseon dynasty beginning in the early 15th century up until the 19th century, but are most often associated with Admiral Yi Sun-sin, who used them in battle against the Japanese in the Imjin War (1592–1598).

- Bulletproof vest

The myeonje baegab was a soft bulletproof vest invented in 1867 in the Joseon dynasty.

- Thousand paces gun

The cheonbochong (천보총; 千步銃), or the "thousand paces gun", was a type of jochong matchlock musket invented in Joseon during the reign of King Sukjong (1674–1720). Compared to other jochongs of the time that had a range of 120m, the cheonbochong was recorded to have a range of 1200m.

- Time bomb

The pigyok chinchollae (비격진천뢰; 飛擊震天雷), also called the Flying Thunderbolt, was a time bomb with an adjustable fuse mechanism that was invented by Yi Jangson and first used in the Imjin War at the Battle of Gyeongju in 1592. It was projected into enemy camps and formations using the wangu mortar, and also used at sea.

- Machine gun

Perhaps the earliest predecessor to the modern machine gun are the chongtong (gun barrel) hwachas of the 15th century. The first of these were created in 1409, in which dozens of stacked rows of bronze gun barrels fired iron bolts. The Moonjong hwacha in 1451 carried 50 gun barrels which each fired sequentially 4 bolts each. The "box" of gun barrels was modular and could be installed and removed on the firing carriage. The gun-barrel type (as opposed to the rocket type) of hwacha predates the weapons considered the earliest forms of machine guns outside of Korea, the Chinese 'Po-Tzu Lien-Chu-P'ao' or 'string-of-100-bullets cannon' developed in the first quarter of the 17th century. The later jujachongtong hwacha developed in 1490 fired 15 iron bullets per barrel, and hundreds of the weapons were produced and deployed throughout the nation.

== Alternative medicine ==
- Kiln sauna

The traditional Korean sauna, called the hanjeungmak, is a domed structure constructed of stone that was first mentioned in the Sejong Sillok of the Annals of the Joseon Dynasty in the 15th century. Supported by Sejong the Great, the hanjeungmak was touted for its health benefits and used to treat illnesses. In the early 15th century, Buddhist monks maintained hanjeungmak clinics, called hanjeungso, to treat sick poor people; these clinics maintained separate facilities for men and women due to high demand. Korean sauna culture and kiln saunas are still popular today, and Korean saunas are ubiquitous.

== Ceramics ==
Inlaid celadon, 12th century

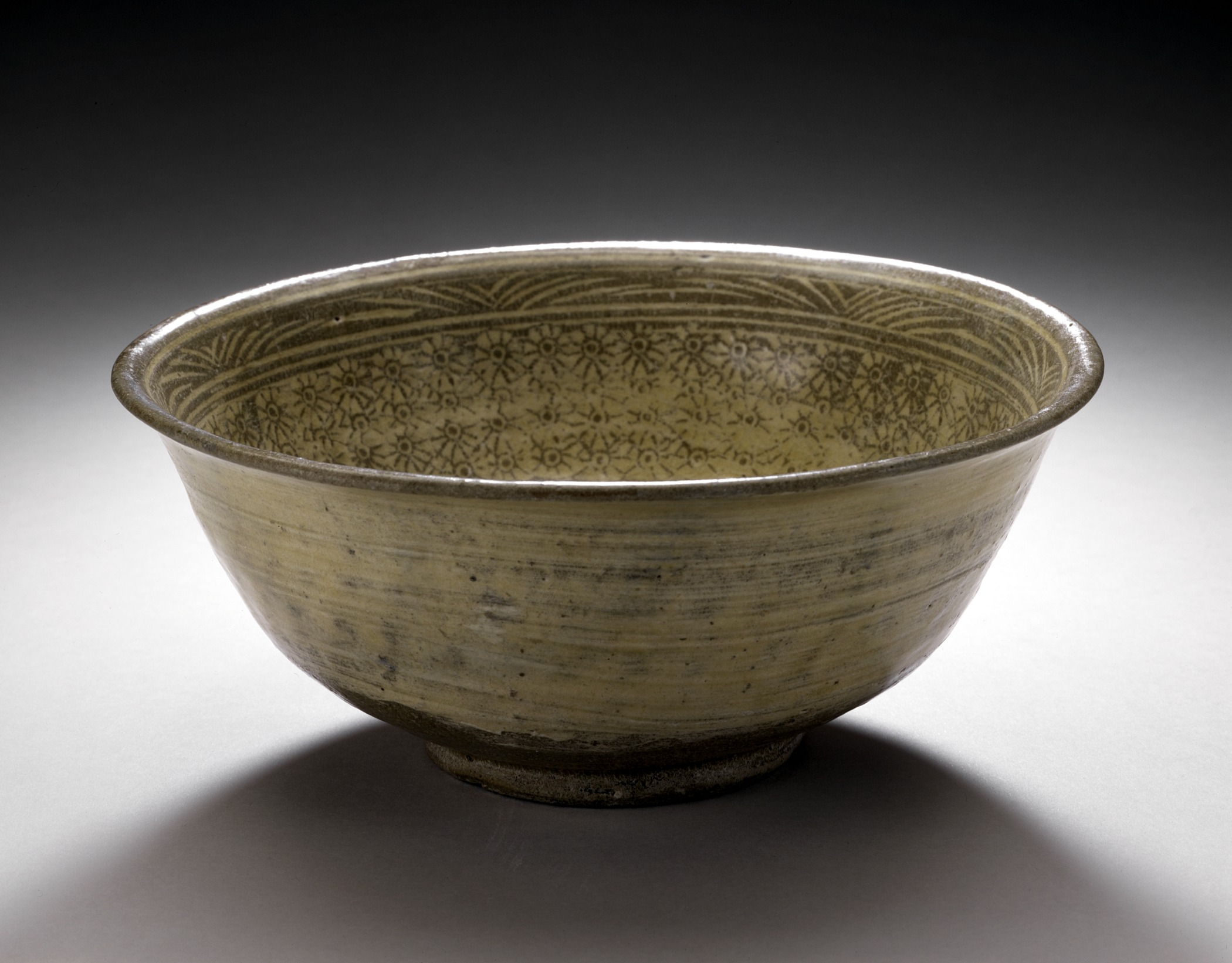
Buncheong, 15th century

- Buncheong

During the Joseon period, Koreans applied the sanggam tradition to create buncheong ceramics. In contrast to the refined elegance of Goryeo celadon, buncheong is designed to be natural, unassuming, and practical. However, the buncheong tradition was gradually replaced by Joseon white porcelain, its aristocratic counterpart, and disappeared in Korea by the end of the 16th century. Buncheong became known and prized in Japan as Mishima.

- Inlaid celadon

Korean celadon reached its pinnacle with the invention of the sanggam inlay technique in the early 12th century during the Goryeo period.

- Karatsu

The Japanese Karatsu style of ceramics originated in Korea.

- Underglaze red

Jinsa "underglaze red", a technique using copper oxide pigment to create copper-red designs, was developed in Korea during the 12th century, and later inspired the "underglaze red" ceramics of the Yuan dynasty.

== Music ==
Jeongganbo musical notation system

- Musical notation

Jeongganbo is a unique traditional musical notation system created during the time of Sejong the Great that was the first East Asian system to represent rhythm, pitch, and time.

- Janggu

First depicted in Goguryeo murals, the janggu is the most representative drum in traditional Korean music.

- Gayageum

The most representative traditional instrument of Korea, the gayageum was created in Gaya during the 6th century, and based on the Chinese guzheng.

- Pansori

Originating in the 17th century during the Joseon period, pansori, also known as "Korean folk opera", is a traditional genre of narrative song performed by a sorikkun singer and a gosu drummer. Pansori was inscribed in the Representative List of the Intangible Cultural Heritage of Humanity by UNESCO in 2008.

== Painting ==
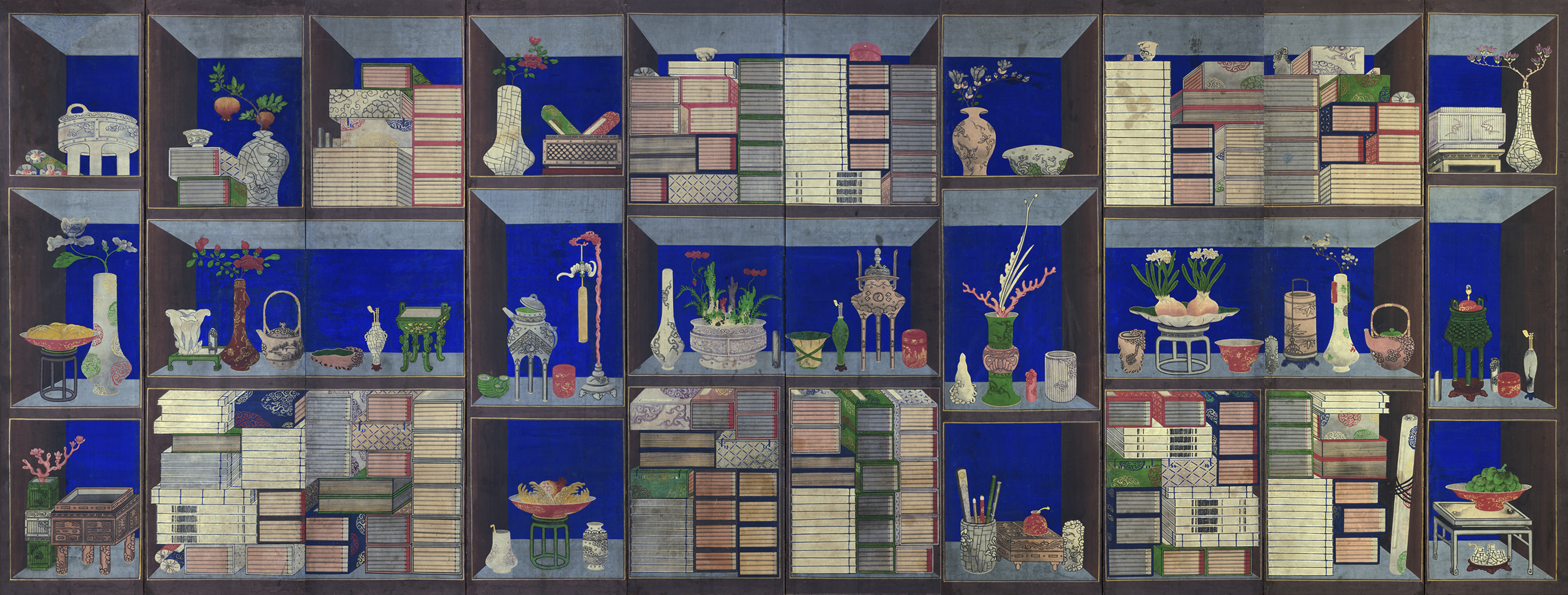
Chaekgeori, 19th century

- Chaekgeori

Chaekgeori (책거리; 冊巨里), translated as "books and things", is a genre of still-life painting from the Joseon period of Korea that features books as the dominant subject. The chaekgeori tradition flourished from the second half of the 18th century to the first half of the 20th century and was enjoyed by all members of the population, from the king to the commoners, revealing the infatuation with books and learning in Korean culture.

- Munjado

Munjado (문자도; 文字圖), also known as "flower writing" (꽃글씨; kkotgeulssi), is a genre of Korean folk art that enjoyed popularity in the 18th and 19th centuries, in which large Chinese characters associated with Confucian philosophy are painted as a representation of their meaning, with depictions of related stories and themes painted into the characters themselves.

== Traditional games ==
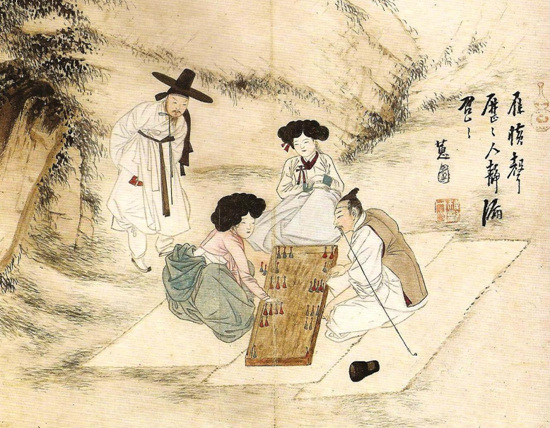
Koreans playing a traditional board game, 18th century

- Yut

Yut is an ancient Korean board game that is still played to this day, especially on Seollal.

- Juryeonggu

Juryeonggu is a 14-sided Polyhedral die invented in the Later Silla period that was used in drinking games.

- Tujeon

Tujeon is a traditional card game, originally based on Madiao, that is played with long rectangular numbered cards. It gradually became linked to gambling.

- Seunggyeongdo

Seunggyeongdo is a traditional board game attributed to Ha Ryun that simulates climbing the Joseon government career ladder and reaching the top by the end.

- Seongbuldo

Seongbuldo is a traditional board game dating back to the Goryeo period that simulates the path to becoming a Buddha. It is still played by Buddhists in Korea.

== Martial arts ==
- Taekkyeon

It is believed that taekkyeon originated from subak (手搏), based on the encyclopedia Manmulbo published in 1798. Taekkyeon almost disappeared during the 20th century but made a resurgence in modern times, and was inscribed in the Representative List of the Intangible Cultural Heritage of Humanity of UNESCO in 2011.

- Ssireum

The earliest evidence of ssireum, or "Korean wrestling", dates back to the Goguryeo period. Originally used in military applications, ssireum became a popular pastime of the people, including many Korean kings, during the Goryeo and Joseon periods. In the 20th century, ssireum became a nationally televised sport in South Korea.

- Gukgung

Gukgung, also known as gungsul, is traditional Korean archery that makes use of the gakgung, the traditional Korean composite bow made of horn.

== Sports ==
- Jangchigi

Jangchigi, originally called dobogyeokdo, is a traditional hockey-like sport that dates back to the Three Kingdoms period. It is related to masanggyeokgu, a traditional polo-like sport that also dates back to the Three Kingdoms period.

== Miscellaneous ==
- Jige

The jige, also known as the A-frame carrier, is a traditional Korean wooden device for carrying heavy loads, that is adapted to Korea's rough mountainous terrain. The jige was adopted by United Nations troops during the Korean War.
