= Magic hexagon =

Arrangement of numbers

Order n = 1 M = 1	Order n = 3 M = 38

A magic hexagon of order n is an arrangement of numbers in a centered hexagonal pattern with n cells on each edge, in such a way that the numbers in each row, in all three directions, sum to the same magic constant M. A normal magic hexagon contains the consecutive integers from 1 to 3n^{2} − 3n + 1. Normal magic hexagons exist only for n = 1 (which is trivial, as it is composed of only 1 cell) and n = 3. Moreover, the solution of order 3 is unique up to reflections and rotations. Meng gives a less intricate constructive proof.

The order-3 magic hexagon with numbers 1 through 19 and magic sum 38 has been published many times as a 'new' discovery. An early reference, and possibly the first discoverer, is Ernst von Haselberg (1887).

== Proof of normal magic hexagons ==
The numbers in the hexagon are consecutive, and run from 1 to $3n^2-3n+1$. Hence their sum is a triangular number, namely

$$s={1\over{2}}(3n^2-3n+1)(3n^2-3n+2)={9n^4-18n^3+18n^2-9n+2\over{2}}$$

There are r = 2n − 1 rows running along any given direction (E-W, NE-SW, or NW-SE). Each of these rows sums up to the same number M. Therefore:

$$M={s\over{r}}={9n^4-18n^3+18n^2-9n+2\over{2(2n-1)}}$$

This can be rewritten as

$$M = \left(\frac{9n^3}{4} - \frac{27n^2}{8} + \frac{45n}{16} - \frac{27}{32}\right) + \frac{5}{32\left(2n-1\right)}$$

Multiplying throughout by 32 gives

$$32M=72n^3-108n^2+90n-27+{5\over2n-1}$$

which shows that $\frac{5}{2n-1}$ must be an integer, hence 2n − 1 must be a factor of 5, namely 2n − 1 = ±1 or 2n − 1 = ±5. The only $n \ge 1$ that meet this condition are $n=1$ and $n=3$, proving that there are no normal magic hexagons except those of order 1 and 3.

== Abnormal magic hexagons ==
Although there are no normal magical hexagons with order greater than 3, certain abnormal ones do exist. In this case, abnormal means starting the sequence of numbers other than with 1.

Here is an order 3 hexagon starting from -9 and summing to 0:

Order 3
M = 0

Arsen Zahray discovered these order 4 and 5 hexagons:

Order 4 M = 111	Order 5 M = 244

The order 4 hexagon starts with 3 and ends with 39, its rows summing to 111. The order 5 hexagon starts with 6 and ends with 66 and sums to 244.

An order 5 hexagon starting with 15, ending with 75 and summing to 305 is this:

A higher sum than 305 for order 5 hexagons is not possible.

Order 5 hexagons, where the "X" are placeholders for order 3 hexagons, which complete the number sequence. The left one contains the hexagon with the sum 38 (numbers 1 to 19) and the right one, one of the 26 hexagons with the sum 0 (numbers −9 to 9). For more information visit the German Wikipedia article.

An order 6 hexagon can be seen below. It was created by Louis Hoelbling, October 11, 2004:

It starts with 21, ends with 111, and its sum is 546.

This magic hexagon of order 7 was discovered using simulated annealing by Arsen Zahray on 22 March 2006:

It starts with 2, ends with 128 and its sum is 635.

An order 8 magic hexagon was generated by Louis K. Hoelbling on February 5, 2006:

It starts with −84 and ends with 84, and its sum is 0.

An order 9 magic hexagon was found by Klaus Meffert on September 10, 2024 with help of an AI:

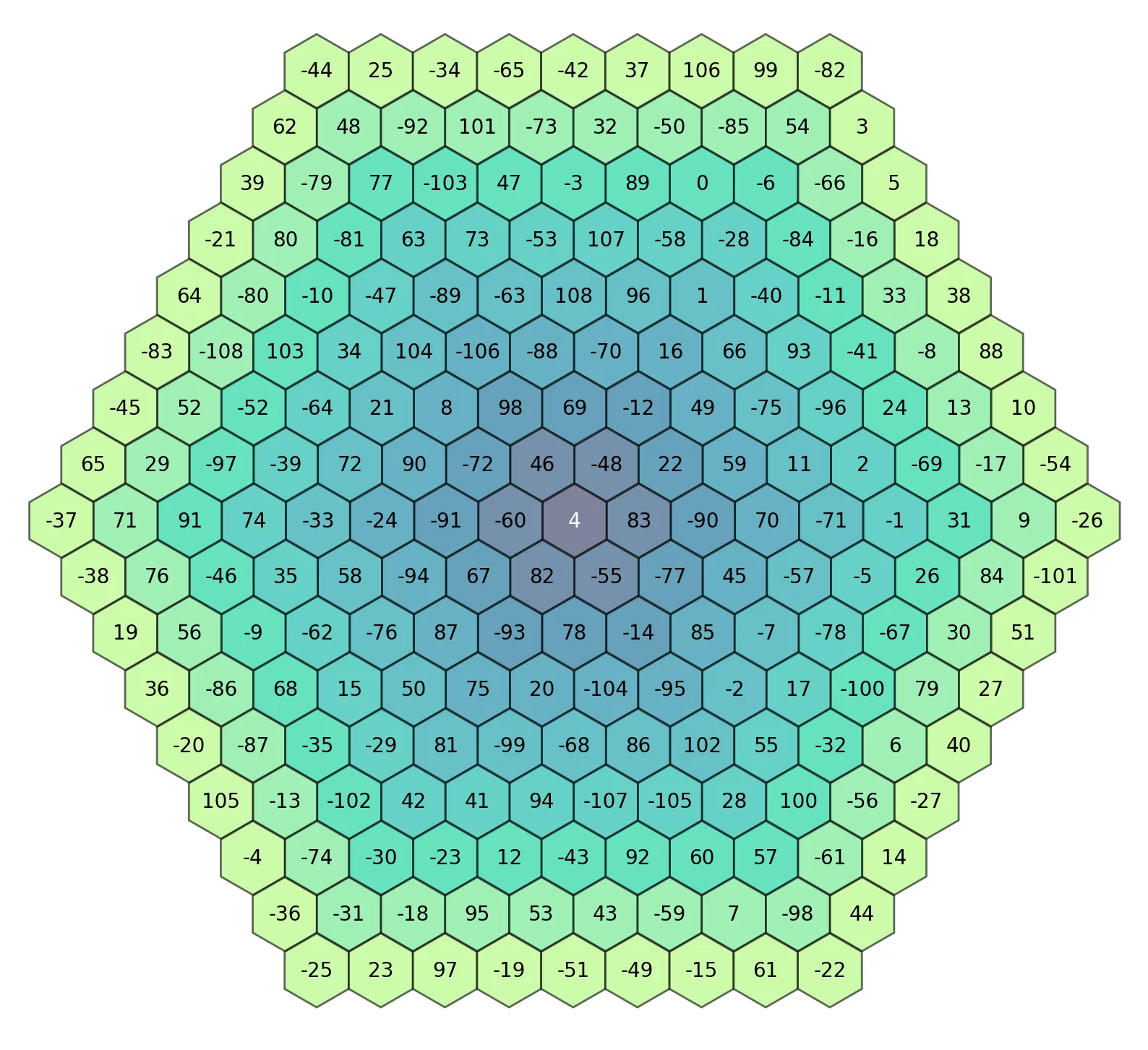

It starts with -108 and ends with 108, and its sum is 0. The solution was found by a python program that was created by the author, utilizing an AI for critical parts of the code.

An order 10 magic hexagon was generated by Louis K. Hoelbling on September 28th, 2026.

It starts with 36, ends with 306 and adds to 2439.

== Magic T-hexagons ==
Hexagons can also be constructed with triangles, as the following diagrams show.

Order 2	Order 2 with numbers 1–24

This type of configuration can be called a T-hexagon and it has many more properties than the hexagon of hexagons.

As with the above, the rows of triangles run in three directions and there are 24 triangles in a T-hexagon of order 2. In general, a T-hexagon of order n has $6n^2$ triangles. The sum of all these numbers is given by:

$$S=3n^2(6n^2 + 1)$$

If we try to construct a magic T-hexagon of side n, we have to choose n to be even, because there are r = 2n rows so the sum in each row must be

$$M=\frac{S}{R}=\frac{3n^2(6n^2+1)}{2n}$$

For this to be an integer, n has to be even. To date, magic T-hexagons of order 2, 4, 6 and 8 have been discovered. The first was a magic T-hexagon of order 2, discovered by John Baker on 13 September 2003. Since that time, John has been collaborating with David King, who discovered that there are 59,674,527 non-congruent magic T-hexagons of order 2.

Magic T-hexagons have a number of properties in common with magic squares, but they also have their own special features. The most surprising of these is that the sum of the numbers in the triangles that point upwards is the same as the sum of those in triangles that point downwards (no matter how large the T-hexagon). In the above example,

17 + 20 + 22 + 21 + 2 + 6 + 10 + 14 + 3 + 16 + 12 + 7
= 5 + 11 + 19 + 9 + 8 + 13 + 4 + 1 + 24 + 15 + 23 + 18
= 150

== See also ==
- Hexagonal tortoise problem
- Magic hexagram
