= Magic hexagram =

Magic hexagram with sum 26

A magic hexagram of order 2 is an arrangement of numbers in a hexagram with triangular cells with 2 cells on each edge, in such a way that the numbers in each row, in all three directions, sum to the same magic constant M.

== Magic star hexagram ==
Magic star hexagram or 6-pointed magic star is a star polygon with Schläfli symbol {6/2} in which numbers are placed at each of the six vertices and six intersections, such that the four numbers on each line sum to the same magic constant.

== Magic star hexagram with triangular cell ==
Magic hexagram with sum 32

Magic hexagram with sum 33

There are two solutions of magic star hexagram with 12 triangular cells.

== Magic star hexagram with more than 12 vertices ==
Magic hexagram with sum 50

Harold Reiter and David Ritchie calculated the solution of magic hexagrams with 19 vertices.

== See also ==
- Magic square
- Magic hexagon
