= Hexagonal tortoise problem =

Mathematical problem

Choi Seok-jeong's original magic hexagonal tortoise pattern. All the sums of six numbers of each hexagon are the same number, 93. The magic sum varies if the numbers 1 through 30 are rearranged. For example, the magic sum could be 77 through 109.

The hexagonal tortoise problem (Korean: 지수귀문도; Hanja: 地數龜文圖; RR: jisugwimundo) was invented by Korean aristocrat and mathematician Choi Seok-jeong (1646–1715). It is a mathematical problem that involves a hexagonal lattice, like the hexagonal pattern on some tortoises' shells, to the (N) vertices of which must be assigned integers (from 1 to N) in such a way that the sum of all integers at the vertices of each hexagon is the same. The problem has apparent similarities to a magic square although it is a vertex-magic format rather than an edge-magic form or the more typical rows-of-cells form.

His book, Gusuryak, contains many mathematical discoveries.

== Related Problems ==
Analogues of the hexagonal tortoise problem based on other Uniform tilings have also been studied. Yang Hui and Choi Seok-jeong studied related magic figures based on the truncated square tiling. Analogues based on the square tiling, in which the sums of the 2×2 subsquares are equal, have also been studied (sequence A355256 in the OEIS), as have analogues based on the trihexagonal tiling (sequence A391236 in the OEIS).

== See Also ==
- Magic hexagon

=== Sources used ===
- Choe, Heemahn; Choi, Sung-Soon; Moon, Byung-Ro (2003). Cantù-Paz, Erick (ed.). A Hybrid Genetic Algorithm for the Hexagonal Tortoise Problem. Proceedings of the Genetic and Evolutionary Computation (GECCO) Conference, Chicago, IL, USA, July 12–16, 2003. Springer. ISBN 978-3-540-40602-0.
