= Ch'ŭgugi =

Rain gauge invented in Korea

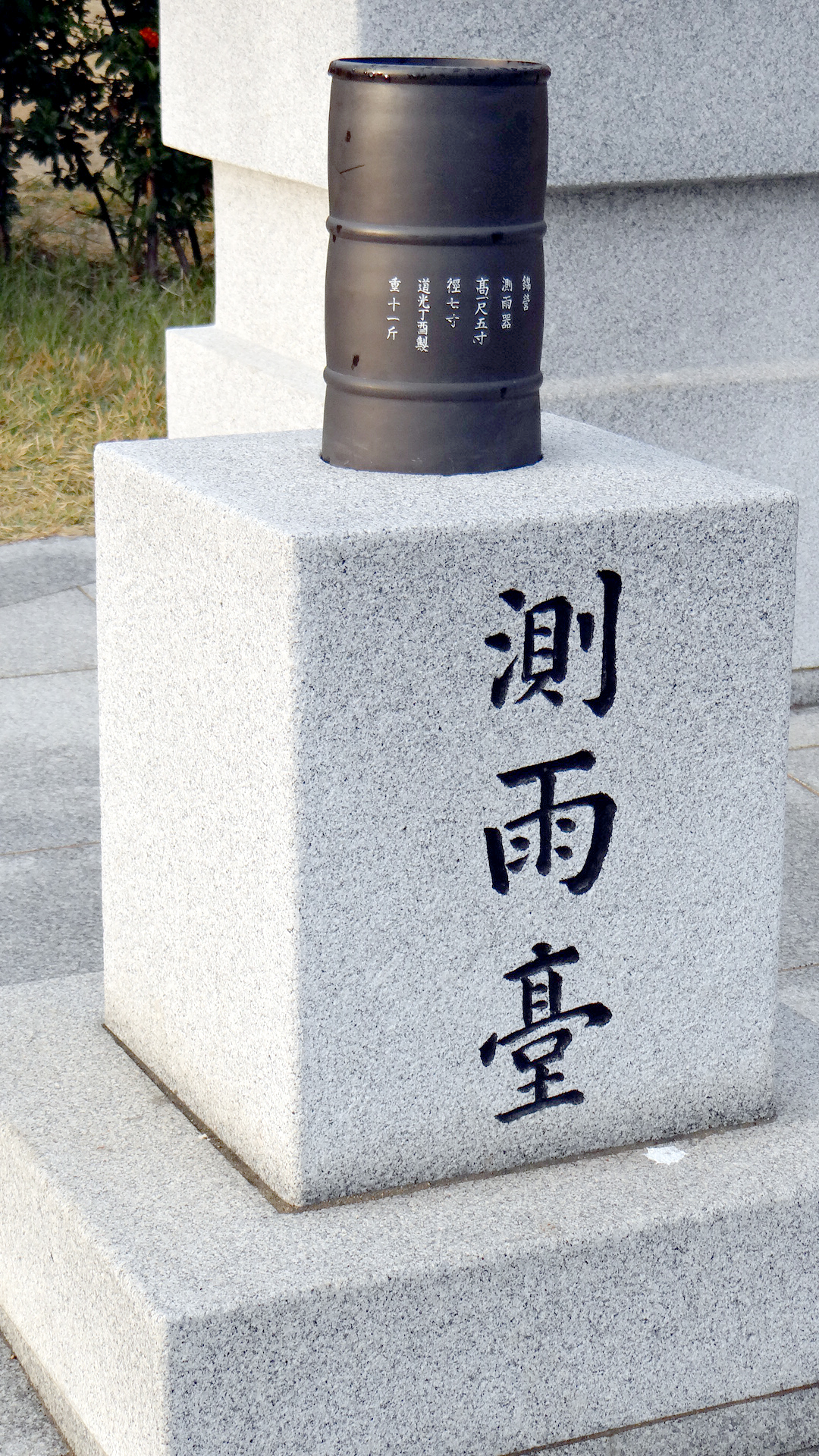
A ch'ŭgugi at Jang Yeong-sil Science Garden in Busan

Ch'ŭgugi (Korean: 측우기; Hanja: 測雨器; RR: cheugugi) were rain gauges invented and used during the Joseon dynasty of Korea. They were invented and supplied to each provincial office during the reign of King Sejong the Great. As of 2010, only one ch'ŭgugi remains, known as the Geumyeong Cheugugi (금영측우기; 錦營測雨器), which literally means "ch'ŭgugi installed on the provincial office's yard." It is designated as National Treasure #561 of Korea and was installed in the provincial office of Gongju city, 1837 by King Yeongjo. In addition, the official measure of rainfall by ch'ŭgugi from King Jeongjo's reign to Emperor Gojong's reign is preserved.

== Intention ==
Early in the Joseon dynasty, a system was introduced to measure and report regional rainfall for the sake of agriculture. However, the method to measure rainfall in those days was primitive, recording the depth of rain water in puddles.

This method could not tell the exact rainfall, because rainwater is absorbed differently into the ground according to the local soil. To prevent errors of this kind, King Sejong the Great ordered the Gwansanggam (Hangul: 관상감, Hanja: 觀象監) (the Joseon kingdom's research institute of astronomy, geography, calendar and weather) to build a rainwater container, the ch'ŭgugi, made of iron in August 1441 (according to the lunar calendar) based on the idea of his Crown Prince, who later became Munjong of Joseon. Initially, it was mainly used in the capital area.

In 1442, the king ordered the Gwansanggam again to design a standardized system to measure and record the rainfall. He also ordered his provincial governors, appointed by the king, to install an identical ch'ŭgugi in the courtyard of each provincial office, where the governors would measure and record the rainfall.

It is estimated that measuring rainfalls by the standardized ch'ŭgugi was institutionalized from the 8th day, 5th month of 1442 (lunar calendar). From that day, the word "ch'ŭgugi" was inscribed on the official records of the Veritable Records of the Joseon Dynasty.

It was originally made of iron, but copper and ceramic ones were used later.

== Exterior features ==
As it is described above, the ch'ŭgugi was mainly made of iron. By observing the preserved one, it is generally characterized by its oil-drum shape which is fixed on the hexahedral stone support, ch'ŭgudae (측우대). The reasonable height of the ch'ŭgudae means that splashed water cannot enter the ch'ŭgugi.

The depth of the preserved ch'ŭgugi is about 32 cm and the diameter is about 15 cm.

== Operation ==
The rainfall is measured by dipping a ruler and recorded by the unit of length pun (푼; 分; approximately 0.303 cm (0.120 inch)). The time when the rain began and stopped is recorded for each storm.

== Examples ==
Some ch'ŭgudae survive:

- Gwansanggam Cheugudae
- Daegu Sunhwadang Cheugudae (established at Daegu)
- Changdeokgung Palace's Cheugudae (moved to the National Palace Museum of Korea)
- Tongyeong Cheugudae
- Yeon-gyeong-dang (the royal residence in forbidden garden of Changdeokgung Palace) Cheugudae

Majeongyo is a bridge generally known as Supyogyo across the Cheonggyecheon (stream flows center of Joseon era's Seoul city (inside area of the Seoul wall), near the palace Gyeongbokgung). The name originated from the supyoseok attached on the pier of the bridge. The Supyo-seok's meaning and function is "the water level gauge" of Cheonggyecheon, telling how much the stream's water level rises from rain. It was established in King Sejong the Great's reign (second year of his reign). In 1958 when the Cheonggyecheon was covered as a road by the Korean government, it was moved to Jang-chung park where it remains.
