= Jige =

Korean tool for carrying things

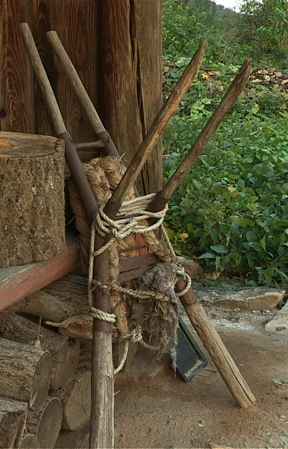
- Classification: Korea traditional tool
- Types: Carrying by back
- Used with: To lift luggage
- Model: Diverse

- Jige
- Hangul: 지게
- RR: jige
- MR: chige

A jige (Korean: 지게) is a traditional Korean pack frame used to carry large quantities of heavy materials. It has been attested to for centuries, and was used in agricultural communities to facilitate the transportation of large quantities of materials such as compost, grain, wood, and grass. Its design varied depending on the region. They are easy to make and have been used extensively due to the mountainous terrain of Korea.

The tool was widely used even during the 1950–1953 Korean War, during which Americans called the tool A-frame.

== History ==
The tool has historically gone by a number of different names. The first known usage of the name jige for it is in a 1690 book (『역어유해』; 『譯語類解』). By the 18th century, this became an established term for the tool.

They were still widely used in rural areas during the 1950–1953 Korean War. American soldiers dubbed them "A-frames", as their general shape resembles the upper-case letter A. They were used to transport supplies and ammunition in mountainous areas the war.

== Part ==
The jige is made of the following parts:

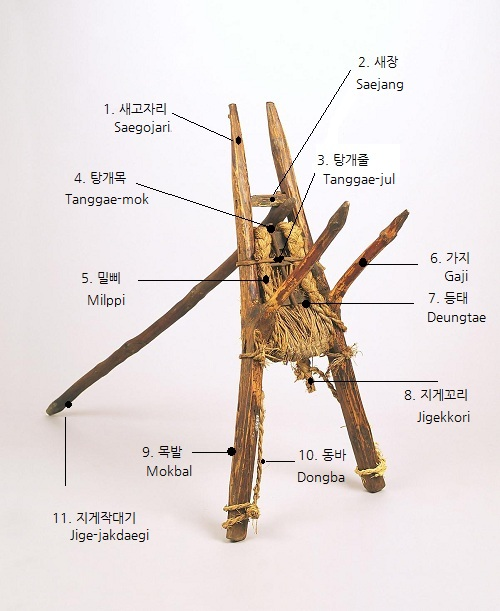
Parts of Jige

1. Saegojari (새고자리): the narrow top.
2. Saejang (새장): a piece of wood that is cut across the base so that its two pairs are woven together. There are usually four or five cages. The top cage is called the whit-saejang or the kkamak-saejang.
3. Tanggae-jul (탕개줄): a rope wrapped around the jige's body to prevent it from falling apart. The woodcutter can hang a sickle on it.
4. Tanggae-mok (탕개목): a piece of wood kept in place by the tanggae-jul.
5. Milppi (밀삐): a strap with straw. It is tied to the milppi-saejang and mokbal.
6. Gaji (가지): a wooden protrusion that supports the load. It is angled upwards from the jige's body.
7. Deungtae (등태): a spot on the back of the peg that is tied with straw.
8. Jigekkori (지게꼬리): a string that is tied onto the jige. It is also called jikkori.
9. Mokbal (목발): the bottom of the jige. It is also called the dong-bal.
10. Dongba (동바): a string that is tied to a mokbal to support a load.
11. Jige-jakdaegi (지게작대기): A piece of wood that is loosely attached. It is used to set up a jige, and is also used as a walking stick to climb a slope with a jige and navigate through the grass.

=== Dialect of part ===
The parts of a jige are named differently according to the regional dialects of Korea.

Standard / Area	Banwol, Gyeong-gi	Deokjeok Gyeong-gi	Bongyang, Choung-buk	Yeongsan, Kyeong-nam	Jangheung, Jeon-nam	Dogye, Gang-won
Saegojari (새고자리)	Saedeumeori (새드머리)	Saemeori (새머리)	Saeppul (새뿔)	Kkamukdori (까묵도리)	Kojak (코작)	Saeppul (새뿔)
Saejang (새장)	Soejang (쇠장)	Saemeorisoe (새머리쇠)	Saejang (새장)	Seojang (서장)	Ssejang (쎄장)	Sejang (세장)
Gaji (가지)	-	-	-	Dwitgaji (뒷가지)	Gaji (가지)	Gaji (가지)
Deungtae (등태)	Deungtae (등태)	Deungtae (등태)	Deungtae (등태)	-	Deungtae (등태)	-
Mokbal (목발)	-	-	Mokbal (목발)	Mokbal (목발)	Tongbal (통발)	Mokdongbal (목동발)
Milppi (밀삐)	Milppang (밀빵)	Tteulppi (뜰삐)	Milppi (밀삐)	Mikkeun (미끈)	MIppang (미빵)	Meppi (메삐)
Tanggae (탕개)	Tanggae (탕개)	-	Taenggae (탱개)	-	Taereunggae (태릉개)	Taenggae (탱개)
Tanggaemok (탕개목)	Tanggaemakdae (탕개막대)	-	Taenggaejakdaegi (탱개작대기)	-	Taereunggae (태릉개)	Taenggaekkojaengi (탱개꼬쟁이)

== Principle and effect ==
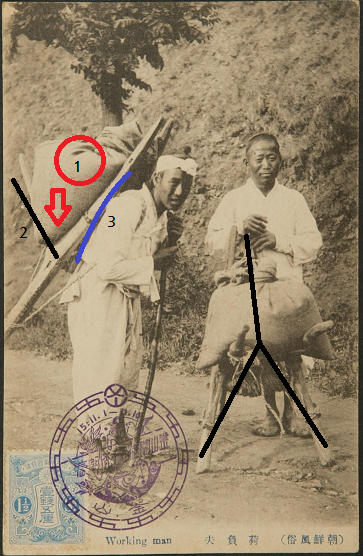
Principle of jige

The triangular shape of the jige from its legs and pole create a stable device to carry objects. By using a jige's pole, a person can also reduce the weight of the center of gravity that supports them in a two-machine frame and decrease the magnitude of the force exerted on their legs when standing up. The tanggae and tanggae-mok act like washers to distribute the load's weight evenly. The legs are loosely attached to easily adjust the device according to the carrier's height. If the load becomes heavier, it must be balanced well on the jige and the carrier must walk at a steady rhythm; otherwise, the load cannot be carried.

The principle of the lever applies to the jige: the shoulders and the back of the jige act as a fulcrum so that the force is moved with small force.

== Classification ==
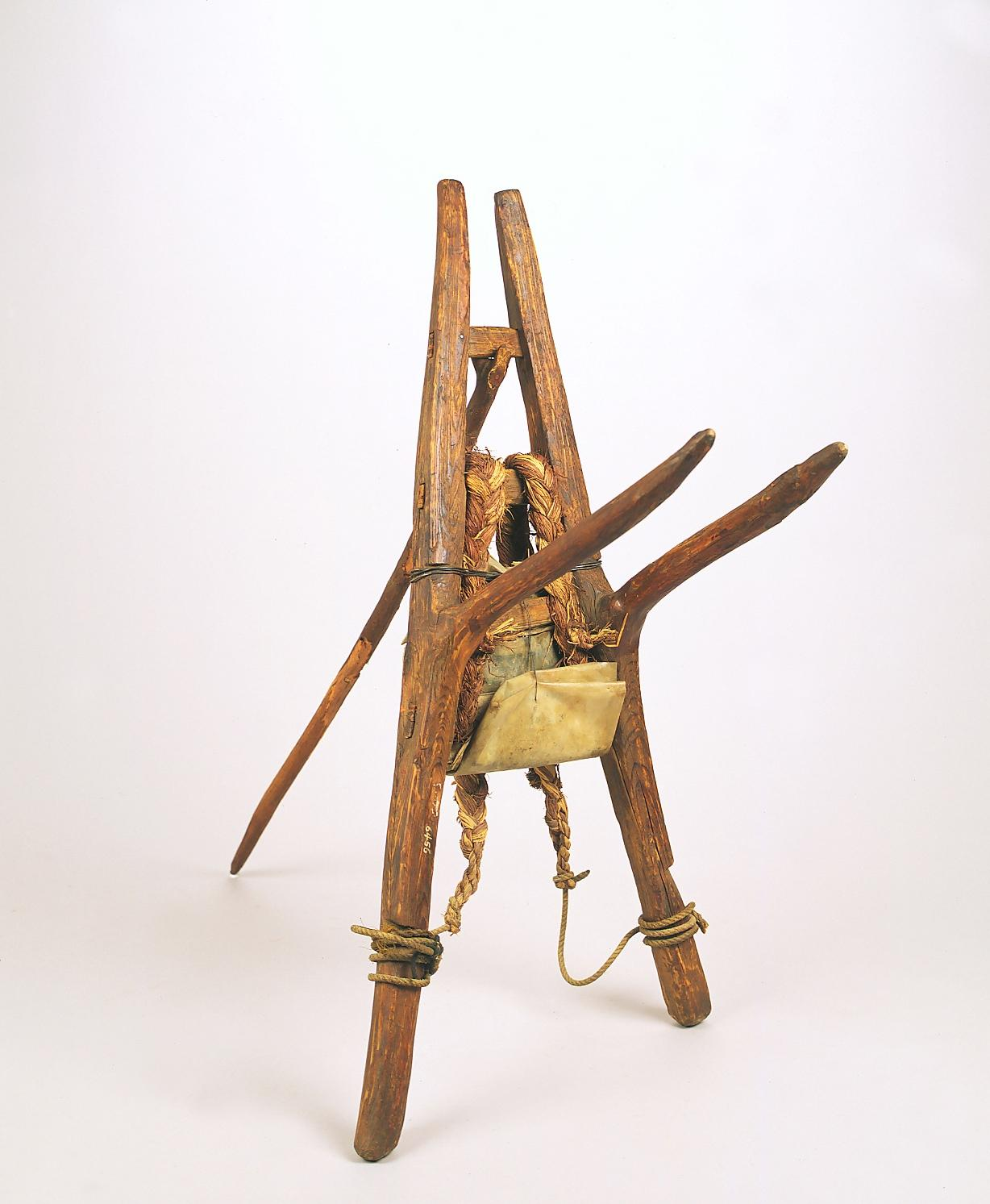
제가지지게 (je-gaji jige)

=== Je-gaji jige ===
The je-gaji jige (제가지지게) is named after the gaji. It needs two pieces of wood that have similar angles, thickness, and location to act as gaji. The length of the jige is usually adjusted to the height of the person who uses it. Je-gaji jige used in plains are longer than those used on mountains, as mountain paths tend to be narrow with a higher risk of the carrier falling down. The narrow upper part of the jige is usually trapezoidal, but some parts of the jige are carved by attaching the top of both sides. The jige's body is made of pine wood. Saejang is made of hard wood, such as a birch or chestnut tree. The shape of deungtae varies by region, and in the mountains and some parts of Gangwon Province, the bottom part of the saejang is widely cut without the deungtae. It is common for the jige to form a trapezoidal shape with its narrow and wide upper parts.

=== Jjok jige ===
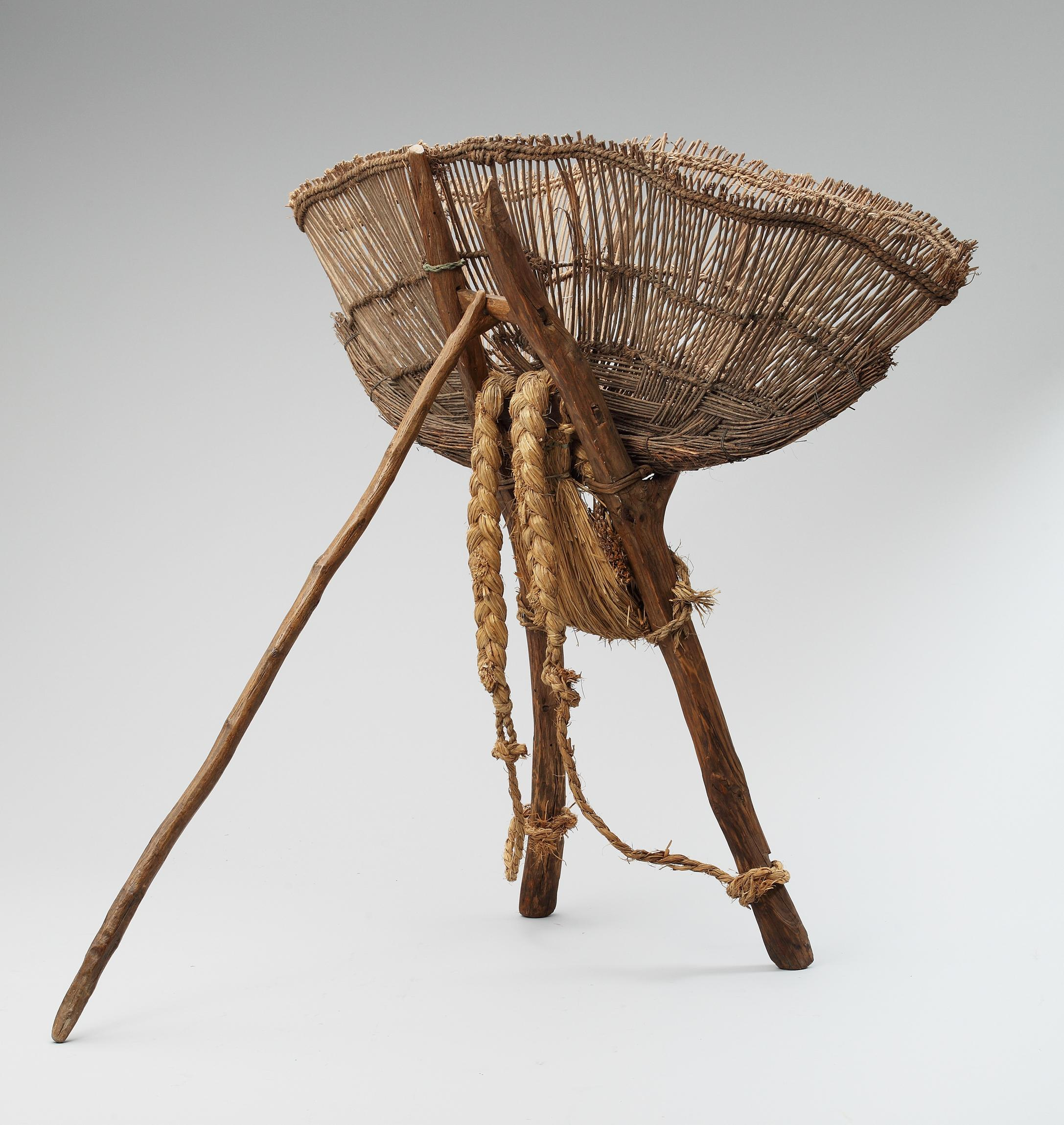
쪽지게 (jjok jige)

The jjok jige (쪽지게) is divided into two types of wood. The carriers try to cut down to get as much weight as possible, and as a result, the length long enough so that they can rest without sitting down on the road.

The jige jakdaegi differs from the standard jige in two ways: the iron stick is (known as the chok jakdaegi) is inserted at the end of the jakdaegi to prevent the carrier from sliding on icy roads and intimidate animals, and the notch in the middle of the top supports the jakdaegi on the jige when a person stands and rests.

Jjok jige in North Jeolla Province is made from cowhide, oak, and acacia trees. It is constructed by cutting down trees and twisting them between the body and gaji.

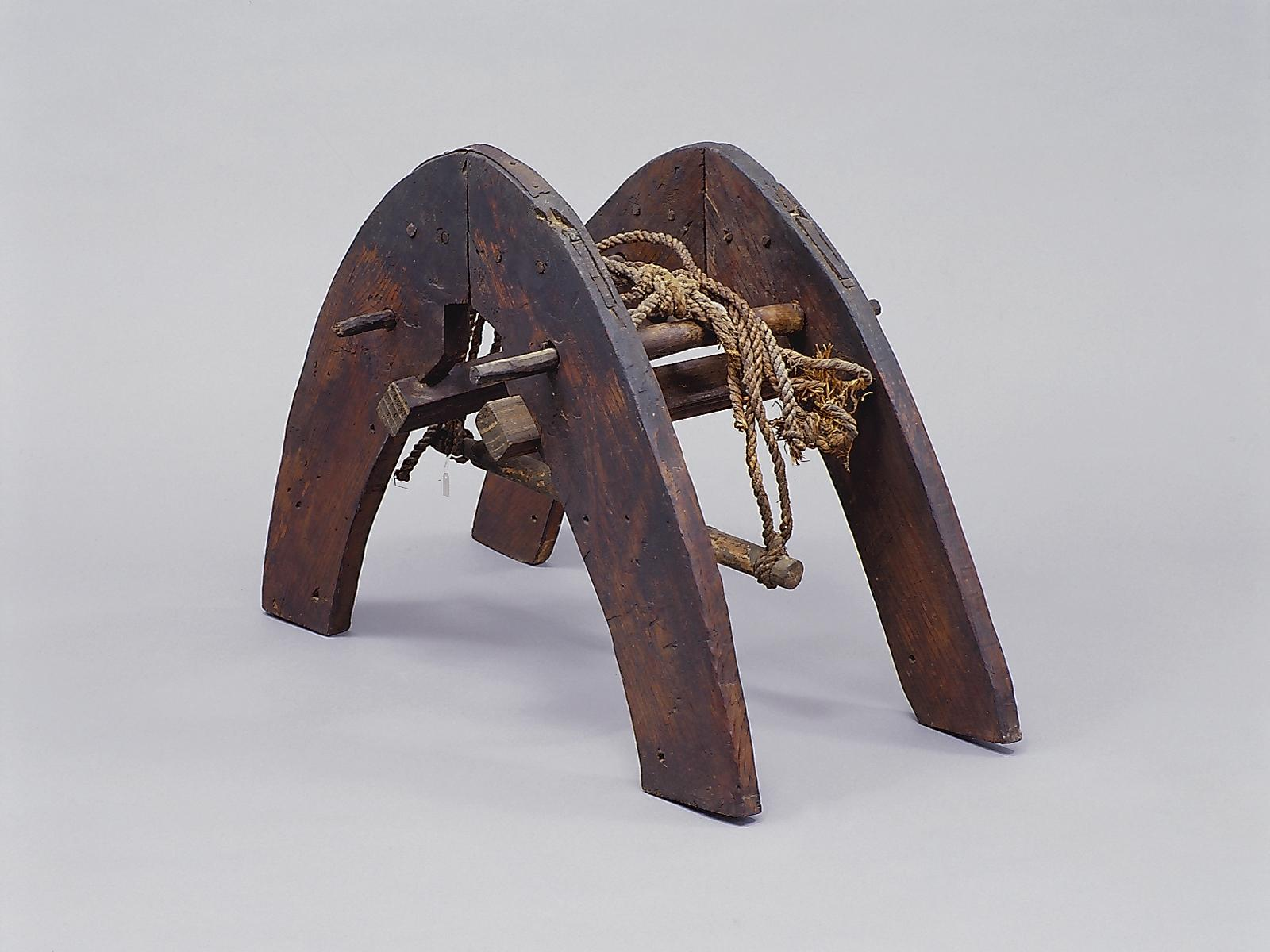
거지게 (Geo Jige)

=== Geo jige ===
The geo jige (거지게) is a very short jige with two or three saejang. The gaji are almost perpendicular to each other, and there is also a horizontal piece of wood to prevent the load from falling. It is usually used on the back of a cow.

=== Ba jige ===
The ba jige (바지게) was used by carriers who traveled inland from the coast of some parts of northern and southern Gyeongsang Province through the mountains. It is usually made from paddock wood. Ba jige does not have gaji.

The ba jige is set up as two long sticks in the shape of an A and placed horizontally in the middle to make the first saejang. Two sticks are connected between the left and right ends to form a triangle. At the base of this triangle, the stick is placed above the apex and replaced with a second saejang. There are no deungtae.

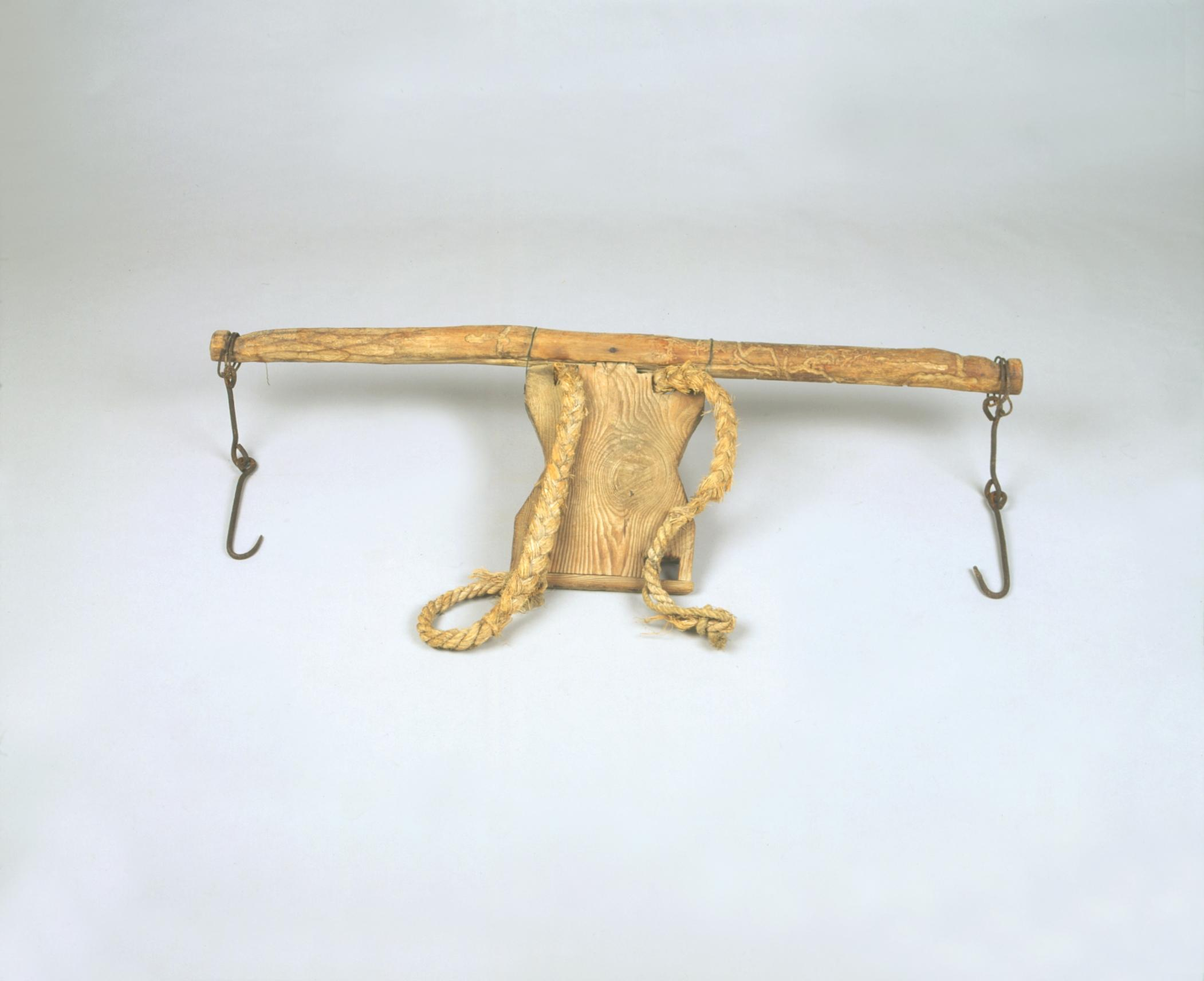
물지게, 거름지게 (Mul Jige, Georeum Jige)

=== Mul jige and georeum jige ===
Mul jige (물지게, 'water jige') and georeum jige (거름지게, 'manure jige') are terms used to refer to a jige that can carry buckets, although the name changed depending on the contents of the buckets. A pole rests horizontally on the carrier's shoulder to carry the buckets on both ends, and is designed to prevent the contents from splashing onto one's clothes.

== Other countries ==
=== China ===
The Chinese variant is called the bei-jia, and is used in the northern mountains of Hubei and Shanxi, China. The difference between China's and Korea's is the presence of a gaji.

=== Taiwan ===
Taiwan's version is fixed by hanging four saejang between two round pieces of wood. The second saejang is tied to both sides and the rope is horizontally tied to the forehead. This method has been used in Taiwan, Nepal, northern Thailand, and southern Japan.

=== Thailand ===
Minorities in northwestern Thailand also use a jige-like tool. It uses three saejang stacked between two long open pieces of wood. The second and third saejang serves as the back of the device and is fitted with two boards.

=== North America ===
Among the natives of North America, the Pima people and Papago tribe used tools called kihos, which consists of a conical bowl, a cactus stick, deungtae, a forehead string, and sticks.

=== Japan ===
In Japan, there is a transportation tool called kago, which is a bamboo basket used to carry people, especially in mountainous regions. It involved a small litter that can hold one individual and is suspended by a pole. It is typically carried by over two men's shoulders. The bamboo basket used in the kago varies and can be used as backpacks or carrying vessels for other objects. The variations depend on the type of weave, like the hip-basket, which has an open weave to allow water drainage or a tight weave to keep loose seeds when transporting grains.

According to the Encyclopedia of Korean Culture, the tool was used on Tsushima Island, which is in between Korea and Japan. There, it went by a transliteration of the Korean name. However, some Japanese scholars argue that it was not borrowed from Korea, but was developed natively there.

== See also ==
- Backpack
