= Choi Seok-jeong =

Korean politician and mathematician

Choi Seok-jeong 최석정
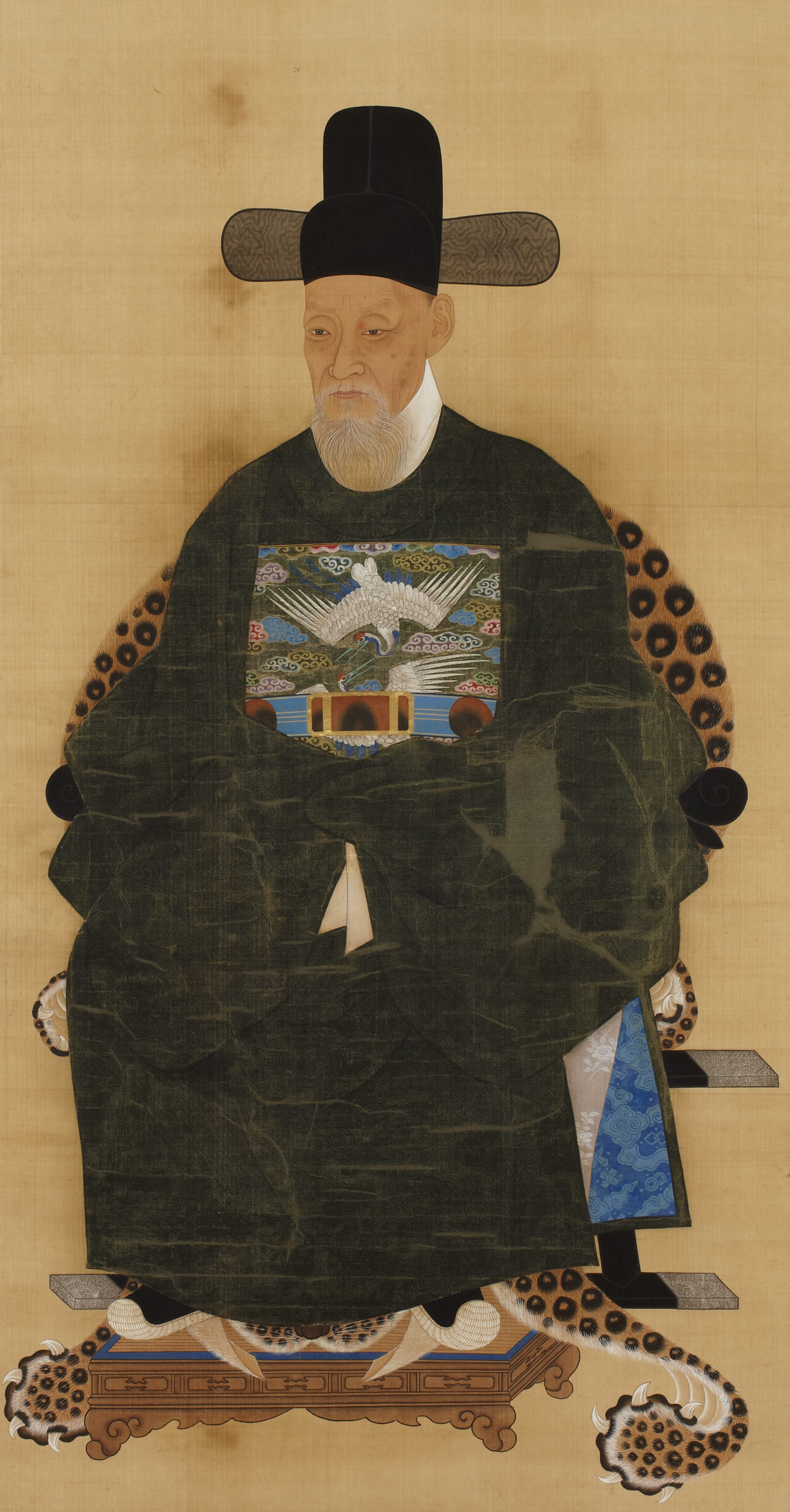

Chief State Councillor
- In office 5 May 1705 – 24 April 1710
- Preceded by: Sin Wan
- Succeeded by: Yi Yeo
- In office 27 March 1703 – 29 July 1703
- Preceded by: Seo Mun-jung
- Succeeded by: Sin Wan
- In office 24 July 1701 – 31 October 1701
- Preceded by: Seo Mun-jung
- Succeeded by: Seo Mun-jung

Left State Councillor
- In office 12 April 1699 – 16 July 1699
- Preceded by: Yi Se-baek
- Succeeded by: Seo Mun-jung

Right State Councillor
- In office 3 April 1697 – 13 July 1698
- Preceded by: Seo Mun-jung
- Succeeded by: Yi Se-baek

Personal details
- Born: 2 July 1646
- Died: 6 December 1715 (aged 69)
- Spouse: Lady Yi Gyeong-eok of the Yi clan
- Children: Choe Chang-dae (son)
- Parents: Choe Hu-ryang (biological) Choe Hu-sang (adoptive) (father); Lady An Jung-im of the Gwangju An clan (biological) (mother)

- Choi Seok-jeong
- Hangul: 최석정
- Hanja: 崔錫鼎
- RR: Choe Seokjeong
- MR: Ch'oe Sŏkchŏng

Art name
- Hangul: 존와, 명곡
- Hanja: 存窩, 明谷
- RR: Jonwa, Myeonggok
- MR: Chonwa, Myŏnggok

Courtesy name
- Hangul: 여시, 여화
- Hanja: 汝時, 汝和
- RR: Yeosi, Yeohwa
- MR: Yŏsi, Yŏhwa

Posthumous name
- Hangul: 문정
- Hanja: 文貞
- RR: Munjeong
- MR: Munjŏng

Childhood name
- Hangul: 석만
- Hanja: 錫萬
- RR: Seokman
- MR: Sŏngman

Choi Seok-jeong (Korean: 최석정; Hanja: 崔錫鼎; 1646–1715) was a Korean politician and mathematician in the Joseon period of Korea.

He published the Gusuryak (Korean: 구수략; Hanja: 九數略) in 1700, the first known literature on Latin squares, predating Leonhard Euler by at least 67 years. He also invented the hexagonal tortoise problem. Choi was a member of the Jeonju Choe clan.

== Choi Seok-jeong Award ==
The Choi Seok-jeong Award was created in 2021 to recognize those who develop or spread mathematics. Spelling of laureates' names matches their Wikipedia page, if it exists, the remainder uses Revised Romanization of Korean.

Year	Laureates	Affiliation
2021	Kim Jae Kyoung; Im Seonhui; Song Hongyeop	KAIST/Institute for Basic Science; Seoul National University; Yonsei University
2022	Kang Myeongju; Oum Sang-il; Hwang Hyeongju	Seoul National University; KAIST/Institute for Basic Science; POSTECH
2023	Kim Jongam; Ye Jongcheol; Kim Sanghyeon	Seoul National University; KAIST; Korea Institute for Advanced Study
2024	Shin Jin-woo; Ha Seungyeol; Lee Ki-hyung	KAIST; Seoul National University; KAOS Foundation
2025	Lee Seung-hyuk; Park Cheol-woo; Park Ki-hyun	Seoul National University; KAIST; Hanshin University (formerly)
