= Cheonsang Yeolcha Bunyajido =

Fourteenth-century Korean star map

- Hangul: 천상열차분야지도
- Hanja: 天象列次分野之圖
- Revised Romanization: Cheonsang Yeolcha Bunyajido
- McCune–Reischauer: Ch'ŏnsang Yŏlch'a Punyajido

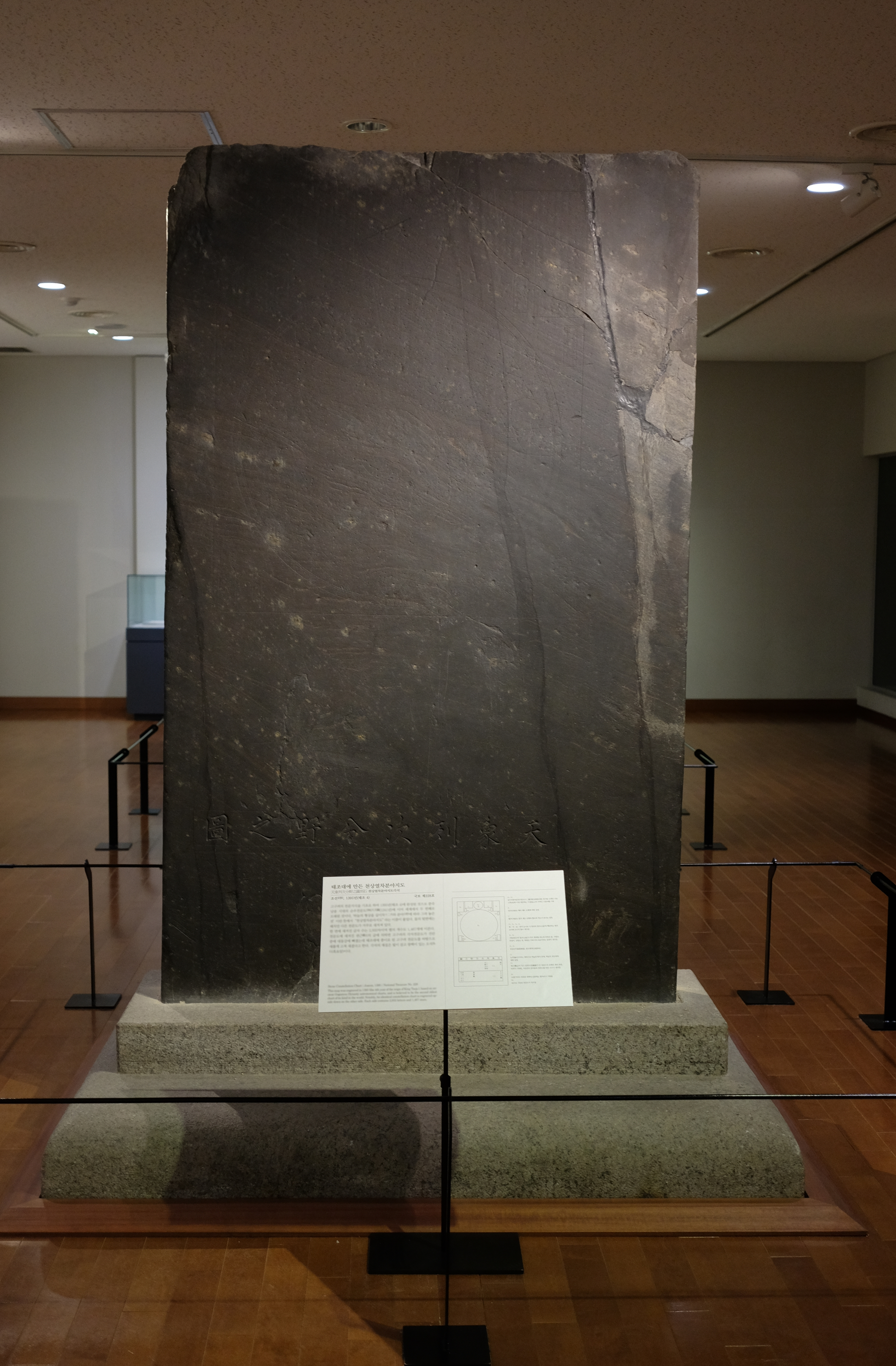
Original engraved stone in King Taejo's era, National Palace Museum Of Korea

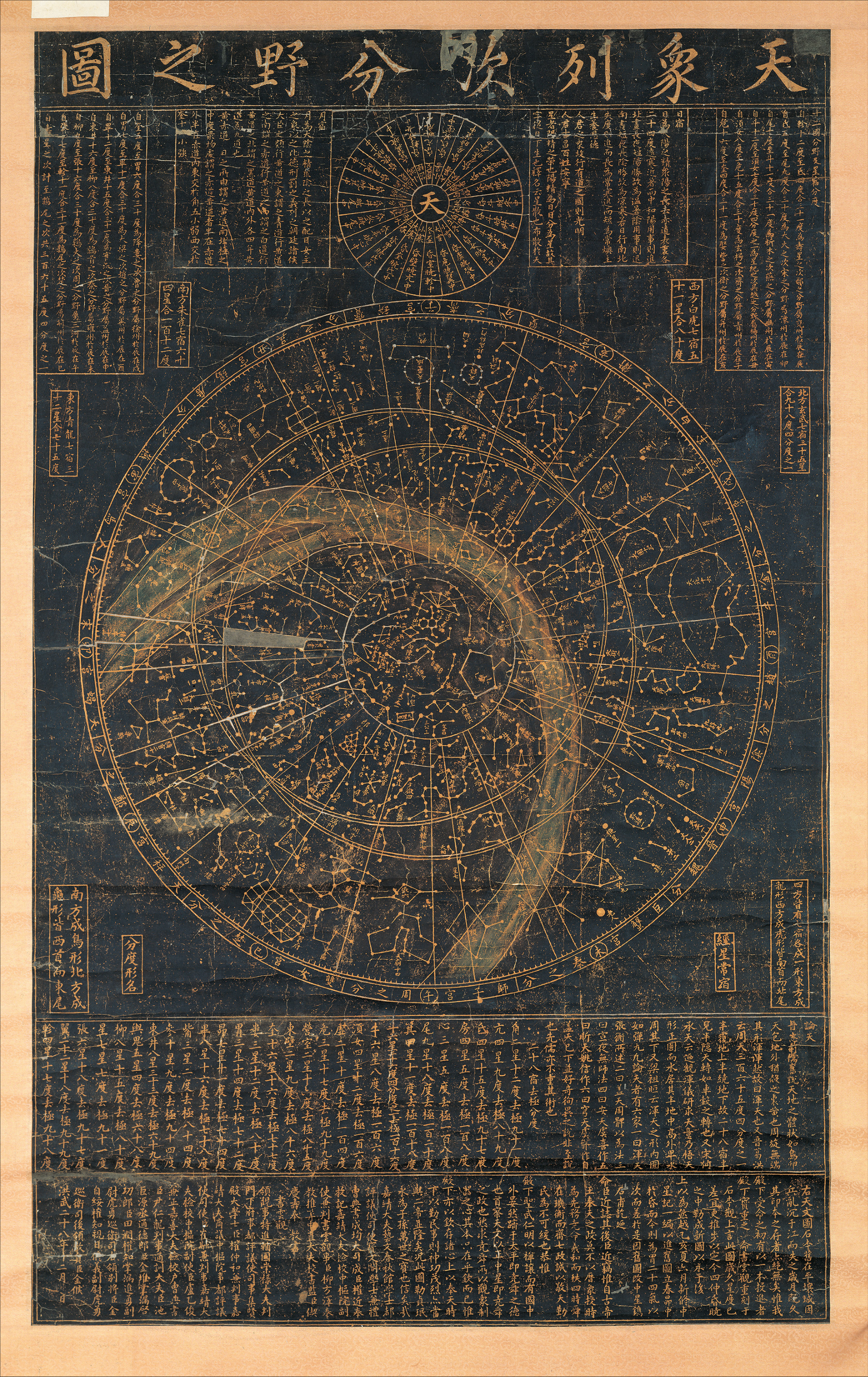
Printed version based on copy-engraved version at King Sukjong era

Cheonsang Yeolcha Bunyajido (Korean: 천상열차분야지도; Hanja: 天象列次分野之圖; Korean pronunciation: [t͡ɕʰʌnsɐŋ jʌɭt͡ɕʰɐ puȵɐd͡ʑido]) is a fourteenth-century Korean star map, copies of which were spread nationwide in the Joseon Dynasty. The name is sometimes translated as the "chart of the constellations and the regions they govern."

Since Korea has been using astronomical maps made in China, problems have arisen because they do not match Korea's latitude and longitude. So, King Taejo ordered royal astronomers to carve the constellations which are suitable for Korea's latitude and longitude on a flat black stone in December, 1395. The stone is about 122.5 cm in width, 211 cm in height, and 12 cm in depth. The engraved stone shows the 1,467 stars visible from Korea, 264 constellations and their names, the ecliptic and equatorial lines, and 365 scales around. It was compiled through a combination of a Goguryeo star map with more recent observations.

The chart shows positions of the heavenly bodies in their natural order, allocated on their respective celestial fields. Its map projection law is found to be the polar equatorial and equidistance projection : the linear distance of an object on the map from the center is lineally proportional to the north polar angular distance.

The epoch of the stellar positions is estimated to be near the First Century for the stars with declination less than fifty degrees, and to be near 1395 AD for stars with declination higher than fifty degrees.

This map became standard during the Joseon dynasty, with numerous copies printed and disseminated throughout the kingdom, until it was superseded by Western planispheres in the nineteenth century.

The map is the 228th national treasure of South Korea, and is exhibited at the National Palace Museum in Seoul.

The map is now used as a background image on the reverse of the 2007 issued 10,000 won banknotes and was featured in the opening ceremonies of the 2018 Winter Olympics in PyeongChang.

== See also ==
- Yi Soon-Jee famous Korean astronomer during the Joseon dynasty,
- Chil Jong-San, also known as Chiljeongsan, a treatise that describes the method for calculating the positions of celestial bodies during exercise. The term “Chiljeong” refers to the Sun, Moon, Mars, Mercury, Jupiter, Venus, and Saturn. This treatise is based on Chinese solar and lunar calendars, as well as the Islamic astronomical method known as Huihui li, adjusted to the latitude and longitude of Hanyang (now Seoul). It includes corrections for the length of day and night and sunrise and sunset times. In essence, Chiljeongsan serves as an auxiliary tool for Chinese calendars and is not an independent astronomical system. Chiljeongsan holds historical significance as Korea’s first astronomical treatise. King Sejong the Great dedicated approximately 20 years to studying Chinese astronomy and science, conducting various astronomical observations, and ensuring that the results aligned with measurements. Thus, Chiljeongsan demonstrates the technological prowess of Joseon-era administration in comprehending celestial science and reevaluating astronomy based on Seoul as the reference point.
- Astrology

== Notes ==
- For example, by Jeon (1998), p. 51.
- Jeon (1998), pp. 51–52. Cites a poem about the map written by Yangchon Kwŏn Kŭn.
